= Tarski's circle-squaring problem =

Problem of cutting and reassembling a disk into a square

Tarski's circle-squaring problem is the challenge, posed by Alfred Tarski in 1925, to take a disc in the plane, cut it into finitely many pieces, and reassemble the pieces so as to get a square of equal area. It is possible, using pieces that are Borel sets, but not with pieces cut by Jordan curves.

== Solutions ==
Tarski's circle-squaring problem was proven to be solvable by Miklós Laczkovich in 1990. The decomposition makes heavy use of the axiom of choice and is therefore non-constructive. Laczkovich estimated the number of pieces in his decomposition at roughly 10^{50}. The pieces used in his decomposition are non-measurable subsets of the plane.

Laczkovich actually proved the reassembly can be done using translations only; rotations are not required. Along the way, he also proved that any simple polygon in the plane can be decomposed into finitely many pieces and reassembled using translations only to form a square of equal area.

It follows from a result of Wilson (2005) that it is possible to choose the pieces in such a way that they can be moved continuously while remaining disjoint to yield the square. Moreover, this stronger statement can be proved as well to be accomplished by means of translations only.

A constructive solution was given by Łukasz Grabowski, András Máthé and Oleg Pikhurko in 2016 which worked everywhere except for a set of measure zero. In 2017, Andrew Marks and Spencer Unger gave a completely constructive solution using Borel sets. In an interview, Marks has claimed it is possible to use about 10^{200} Borel pieces.

== Limitations ==
Lester Dubins, Morris W. Hirsch & Jack Karush proved it is impossible to dissect a circle and make a square using pieces that could be cut with an idealized pair of scissors (that is, having Jordan curve boundary).

== Related problems ==
The Bolyai–Gerwien theorem is a related but much simpler result: it states that one can accomplish such a decomposition of a simple polygon with finitely many polygonal pieces if both translations and rotations are allowed for the reassembly.

These results should be compared with the much more paradoxical decompositions in three dimensions provided by the Banach–Tarski paradox; those decompositions can even change the volume of a set. However, in the plane, a decomposition into finitely many pieces must preserve the sum of the Banach measures of the pieces, and therefore cannot change the total area of a set.

== See also ==
- Squaring the circle, a different problem: the task (which has been proven to be impossible) of constructing, for a given circle, a square of equal area with straightedge and compass alone.
