= Borel regular measure =

Type of measure on Euclidean spaces

In mathematics, an outer measure μ on n-dimensional Euclidean space R^{n} is called a Borel regular measure if the following two conditions hold:

- Every Borel set B ⊆ R^{n} is μ-measurable in the sense of Carathéodory's criterion: for every A ⊆ R^{n},

$$\mu (A) = \mu (A \cap B) + \mu (A \setminus B).$$

- For every set A ⊆ R^{n} there exists a Borel set B ⊆ R^{n} such that A ⊆ B and μ(A) = μ(B).

Notice that the set A need not be μ-measurable: μ(A) is however well defined as μ is an outer measure. An outer measure satisfying only the first of these two requirements is called a Borel measure (differing from the usual Borel measure), while an outer measure satisfying only the second requirement (with the Borel set B replaced by a μ-measurable set B) is called a regular outer measure.

The Lebesgue outer measure on R^{n} is an example of a Borel regular measure.

It can be proved that a Borel regular measure, although introduced here as an outer measure (only countably subadditive), becomes a full measure (countably additive) if restricted to the Borel sets.
