= Conull set =

In measure theory, a conull set is a set whose complement is null, i.e., the measure of the complement is zero. For example, the set of irrational numbers is a conull subset of the real line with Lebesgue measure.

A property that is true of the elements of a conull set is said to be true almost everywhere.
