= Carathéodory's theorem =

In mathematics, Carathéodory's theorem may refer to one of a number of results of Constantin Carathéodory:

- Carathéodory's theorem (conformal mapping), about the extension of conformal mappings to the boundary
- Carathéodory's theorem (convex hull), about the convex hulls of sets in $\R^d$
- Carathéodory's existence theorem, about the existence of solutions to ordinary differential equations
- Carathéodory's extension theorem, about the extension of a measure
- Carathéodory–Jacobi–Lie theorem, a generalization of Darboux's theorem in symplectic topology
- Carathéodory's criterion, a necessary and sufficient condition for a measurable set
- Carathéodory kernel theorem, a geometric criterion for local uniform convergence of univalent functions
- Borel–Carathéodory theorem, about the boundedness of a complex analytic function
- Vitali–Carathéodory theorem, a result in real analysis
