= Complete measure =

Measure space in mathematics

In mathematics, a complete measure (or, more precisely, a complete measure space) is a measure space in which every subset of every null set is measurable (having measure zero). More formally, a measure space (X, Σ, μ) is complete if and only if

$$S \subseteq N \in \Sigma \mbox{ and } \mu(N) = 0\ \Rightarrow\ S \in \Sigma.$$

== Motivation ==
The need to consider questions of completeness can be illustrated by considering the problem of product spaces.

Suppose that we have already constructed Lebesgue measure on the real line: denote this measure space by $(\R, B, \lambda).$ We now wish to construct some two-dimensional Lebesgue measure $\lambda^2$ on the plane $\R^2$ as a product measure. Naively, we would take the 𝜎-algebra on $\R^2$ to be $B \otimes B,$ the smallest 𝜎-algebra containing all measurable "rectangles" $A_1 \times A_2$ for $A_1, A_2 \in B.$

While this approach does define a measure space, it has a flaw. Since every singleton set has one-dimensional Lebesgue measure zero,
$$\lambda^2(\{0\} \times A) \leq \lambda(\{0\}) = 0$$
for any subset $A$ of $\R.$ However, suppose that $A$ is a non-measurable subset of the real line, such as the Vitali set. Then the $\lambda^2$-measure of $\{0\} \times A$ is not defined but
$$\{0\} \times A \subseteq \{0\} \times \R,$$
and this larger set does have $\lambda^2$-measure zero. So this "two-dimensional Lebesgue measure" as just defined is not complete, and some kind of completion procedure is required.

== Construction of a complete measure ==
Given a (possibly incomplete) measure space (X, Σ, μ), there is an extension (X, Σ_{0}, μ_{0}) of this measure space that is complete. The smallest such extension (i.e. the smallest σ-algebra Σ_{0}) is called the completion of the measure space.

The completion can be constructed as follows:

- let Z be the set of all the subsets of the zero-μ-measure subsets of X (intuitively, those elements of Z that are not already in Σ are the ones preventing completeness from holding true);
- let Σ_{0} be the σ-algebra generated by Σ and Z (i.e. the smallest σ-algebra that contains every element of Σ and of Z);
- μ has an extension μ_{0} to Σ_{0} (which is unique if μ is σ-finite), called the outer measure of μ, given by the infimum

$$\mu_{0} (C) := \inf \{ \mu (D) \mid C \subseteq D \in \Sigma \}.$$

Then (X, Σ_{0}, μ_{0}) is a complete measure space, and is the completion of (X, Σ, μ).

In the above construction it can be shown that every member of Σ_{0} is of the form A ∪ B for some A ∈ Σ and some B ∈ Z, and

$$\mu_{0} (A \cup B) = \mu (A).$$

== Examples ==
- Borel measure as defined on the Borel σ-algebra generated by the open intervals of the real line is not complete, and so the above completion procedure must be used to define the complete Lebesgue measure. This is illustrated by the fact that the set of all Borel sets over the reals has the same cardinality as the reals. While the Cantor set is a Borel set, has measure zero, and its power set has cardinality strictly greater than that of the reals. Thus there is a subset of the Cantor set that is not contained in the Borel sets. Hence, the Borel measure is not complete.
- n-dimensional Lebesgue measure is the completion of the n-fold product of the one-dimensional Lebesgue space with itself. It is also the completion of the Borel measure, as in the one-dimensional case.

== Properties ==
Maharam's theorem states that every complete measure space is decomposable into measures on continua, and a finite or countable counting measure.

== See also ==
- Inner measure
- Lebesgue measurable set – Concept of area in any dimension
