= Inner measure =

In mathematics, in particular in measure theory, an inner measure is a function on the power set of a given set, with values in the extended real numbers, satisfying some technical conditions. Intuitively, the inner measure of a set is a lower bound of the size of that set.

== Definition ==
An inner measure is a set function
$$\varphi : 2^X \to [0, \infty],$$
defined on all subsets of a set $X,$ that satisfies the following conditions:

- Null empty set: The empty set has zero inner measure (see also: measure zero); that is,
  $$\varphi(\varnothing) = 0$$
- Superadditive: For any disjoint sets $A$ and $B,$
  $$\varphi(A \cup B) \geq \varphi(A) + \varphi(B).$$
- Limits of decreasing towers: For any sequence $A_1, A_2, \ldots$ of sets such that $A_j \supseteq A_{j+1}$ for each $j$ and $\varphi(A_1) < \infty$
  $$\varphi \left(\bigcap_{j=1}^\infty A_j\right) = \lim_{j \to \infty} \varphi(A_j)$$
- If the measure is not finite, that is, if there exist sets $A$ with $\varphi(A) = \infty$, then this infinity must be approached. More precisely, if $\varphi(A) = \infty$ for a set $A$ then for every positive real number $r,$ there exists some $B \subseteq A$ such that
  $$r \leq \varphi(B) < \infty.$$

== The inner measure induced by a measure ==
Let $\Sigma$ be a σ-algebra over a set $X$ and $\mu$ be a measure on $\Sigma.$ Then the inner measure $\mu_*$ induced by $\mu$ is defined by
$$\mu_*(T) = \sup\{\mu(S) : S \in \Sigma \text{ and } S \subseteq T\}.$$

Essentially $\mu_*$ gives a lower bound of the size of any set by ensuring it is at least as big as the $\mu$-measure of any of its $\Sigma$-measurable subsets. Even though the set function $\mu_*$ is usually not a measure, $\mu_*$ shares the following properties with measures:

1. $\mu_*(\varnothing) = 0,$
2. $\mu_*$ is non-negative,
3. If $E \subseteq F$ then $\mu_*(E) \leq \mu_*(F).$

== Measure completion ==
Induced inner measures are often used in combination with outer measures to extend a measure to a larger σ-algebra. If $\mu$ is a finite measure defined on a σ-algebra $\Sigma$ over $X$ and $\mu^*$ and $\mu_*$ are corresponding induced outer and inner measures, then the sets $T \in 2^X$ such that $\mu_*(T) = \mu^*(T)$ form a σ-algebra $\hat \Sigma$ with $\Sigma\subseteq\hat\Sigma$. The set function $\hat\mu$ defined by
$$\hat\mu(T) = \mu^*(T) = \mu_*(T)$$
for all $T \in \hat \Sigma$ is a measure on $\hat \Sigma$ known as the completion of $\mu.$

== See also ==
- Lebesgue measurable set – Broadest definition of sizes in integer-dimensional spaces
