= Hausdorff paradox =

Paradox in mathematics

The Hausdorff paradox is a paradox in mathematics named after Felix Hausdorff. It involves the sphere ${ S^2}$ (the surface of a 3-dimensional ball in ${ \R^3 }$). It states that if a certain countable subset is removed from ${ S^2 }$, then the remainder can be divided into three disjoint subsets ${ A,B }$ and ${ C }$ such that ${ A, B, C }$ and ${ B \cup C }$ are all congruent. In particular, it follows that on $S^2$ there is no finitely additive measure defined on all subsets such that the measure of congruent sets is equal (because this would imply that the measure of ${ B \cup C }$ is simultaneously $1/3$, $1/2$, and $2/3$ of the non-zero measure of the whole sphere).

The paradox was published in Mathematische Annalen in 1914 and also in Hausdorff's book, Grundzüge der Mengenlehre, the same year. The proof of the much more famous Banach–Tarski paradox uses Hausdorff's ideas. The proof of this paradox relies on the axiom of choice. This paradox shows that there is no finitely additive measure on a sphere defined on all subsets which is equal on congruent pieces. (Hausdorff first showed in the same paper the easier result that there is no countably additive measure defined on all subsets.) The structure of the group of rotations on the sphere plays a crucial role here – the statement is not true on the plane or the line. In fact, as was later shown by Banach, it is possible to define an "area" for all bounded subsets in the Euclidean plane (as well as "length" on the real line) in such a way that congruent sets will have equal "area". (This Banach measure, however, is only finitely additive, so it is not a measure in the full sense, but it equals the Lebesgue measure on sets for which the latter exists.) This implies that if two open subsets of the plane (or the real line) are equi-decomposable then they have equal area.

== See also ==
- Banach–Tarski paradox – Geometric theorem
- Paradoxes of set theory
