= Non-measurable set =

Set with no meaningful size

In mathematics, a non-measurable set is a set which cannot be assigned a meaningful size, such as a length, area, or volume. The term is normally applied to Lebesgue measure, which assigns a length to a very large family of subsets of the real numbers $\R$ but which cannot be extended to all subsets. In Zermelo–Fraenkel set theory with the axiom of choice, non-measurable subsets of $\R$ exist. The first example of one was constructed by Giuseppe Vitali in 1905. The existence of non-measurable sets marks a limit on how far the intuitive notion of size can be extended, and it is one of the best-known consequences of the axiom of choice.

Whether the existence of such sets can be avoided depends on how much additivity is demanded of the measure and the dimension of the space. In every case, however, the set itself can be produced only by invoking some form of the axiom of choice.

If countable additivity is required, which the usual axioms of probability demand, then Vitali's construction already rules out assigning a length to every subset of the reals, and the same obstruction arises in every dimension. If only finite additivity is required, the line and the plane are free of the obstruction: each admits a measure defined on all of its subsets that agrees with ordinary length or area and is unchanged by rigid motion. Three-dimensional space does not escape. The Hausdorff paradox of 1914 and the Banach–Tarski paradox of 1924 show that the surface of a sphere and a solid ball can each be divided into finitely many pieces and reassembled into something of a different size, so that in three dimensions no finitely additive notion of volume can apply to every subset and still be unaffected by rigid motion.

In 1970, Robert M. Solovay showed that existence of a non-measurable set cannot be proved from the Zermelo–Fraenkel axioms alone: assuming an inaccessible cardinal, he constructed a model of ZF in which the weaker axiom of dependent choice holds and every set of real numbers is Lebesgue measurable.

== Background ==
The measure of the union of two disjoint sets is naturally expected to equal the sum of the measures of the two sets. A measure with this property is called finitely additive. Finite additivity matches the intuitive notion of area and provides the basis of Riemann integration. Countable additivity, which applies to a countably infinite collection of sets, is a stronger axiom that underlies Lebesgue's theory, and with it the convergence theorems and the standard axioms of probability.

== Historical constructions ==
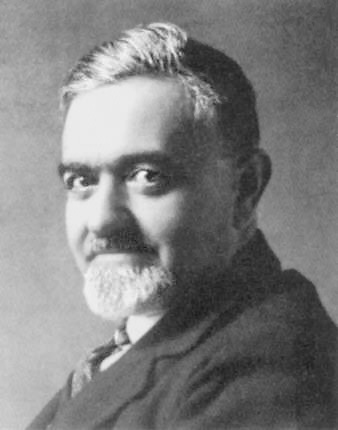
Giuseppe Vitali (1875–1932)

The first indication that length cannot be defined for arbitrary sets came in 1905, when Giuseppe Vitali used the axiom of choice to construct a set of real numbers that is not Lebesgue measurable. The Vitali set shows that no countably additive, translation-invariant measure can be defined on every subset of the real line while assigning a length to each interval.

Stefan Banach proved in 1923 that the line and the plane each admit a measure defined on all of their subsets, not just the Lebesgue-measurable ones. Such a measure is now called a Banach measure: it is invariant under all rigid motions and reflections; it agrees with Lebesgue measure wherever Lebesgue measure is defined; and it is additive over finite unions, though not over countable ones. It follows that no bounded planar region can be cut into finitely many pieces and reassembled by rigid motions into two copies of itself.

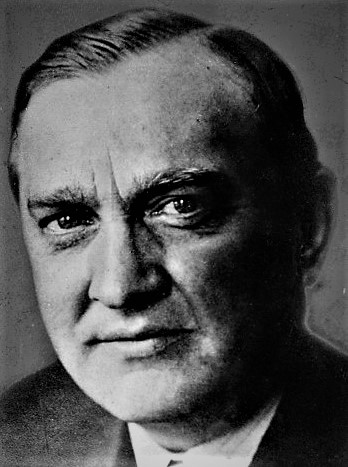
Stefan Banach (1892–1945)

Rotations in three dimensions combine more freely than motions of the plane. Rotations about two different axes can be strung together in endlessly many ways that never bring a point back where it began. This freedom leaves room to shuffle points between pieces with none lost or gained. In 1914 Felix Hausdorff used this freedom to divide the surface of a sphere, apart from a countable set of points, into three disjoint subsets that are congruent to one another and each also congruent to the union of the other two. No reasonable notion of area survives the Hausdorff paradox: each piece ought to be a third of the sphere, yet one matches the other two combined, and so ought to be two-thirds.

In 1924, Banach and Alfred Tarski carried the construction into solid bodies. The Banach–Tarski paradox states that a ball can be divided into finitely many pieces that, when merely moved and rotated, reassemble into two balls of the original size. The pieces are not chunks of the kind a knife would cut, but infinitely intricate clouds of points obtained using the axiom of choice. No consistent volume can be assigned to all of them, so at least some must be non-measurable sets. In 1947, Raphael M. Robinson showed that the minimum number of pieces needed is five (or four if the ball's center point is omitted). This paradox applies not simply to spheres, but to arbitrary bounded volumes with a nonempty interior.

Some form of choice is indispensable to all of these constructions. In 1970, Solovay showed that the existence of a set of real numbers that is not Lebesgue measurable is not provable within Zermelo–Fraenkel set theory alone. Assuming the consistency of an inaccessible cardinal, he constructed a model of ZF, called the Solovay model, in which the axiom of dependent choice holds yet every set of real numbers is Lebesgue measurable and the full axiom of choice fails. In 1984, Saharon Shelah proved that the inaccessible cardinal is necessary.

== Construction of a non-measurable set ==
The following construction, which is essentially Vitali's, produces a set to which no notion of length can be assigned. Let $S$ be the unit circle in the complex plane, and let $G$ be the group of rotations through angles which are rational multiples of $\pi$. Then $G$ is countable, because the rational numbers are countable, while $S$ is uncountable. Hence $S$ splits into uncountably many orbits under $G$; the orbit of $s$ is the countable set $\{ s e^{i q \pi} : q \in \mathbb{Q} \}$. Using the axiom of choice, pick one point from each orbit to form a set $X$. Its rotated copies $gX$, one for each $g \in G$, are then pairwise disjoint, mutually congruent, countable, and together make up the whole circle. No rotation-invariant, countably additive probability measure on $S$ can give $X$ a value. The copies are congruent, so each would have to have the same measure as $X$; were that measure zero the circle would measure zero rather than one, and were it positive the circle would measure infinity (a countable sum of equal positive numbers diverges). No such measure can give $X$ a value; $X$ is therefore non-measurable.

The analogous construction on the line, picking one member from each group of real numbers that differ by a rational number (from the equivalence classes of real numbers under the relation $x \sim y$ when $x - y$ is rational), yields the Vitali set.

== The measure problem ==
Lebesgue's measure problem seeks a function $\mu$ that assigns every bounded subset of $\mathbb{R}^n$ a non-negative real number such that: $\mu([0,1]^n)=1$; $\mu$ is unchanged by rigid motions and reflections; and the measures of disjoint sets add up. Normalization, invariance, and additivity make $\mu$ a concept of volume. However, all three conditions cannot apply to all subsets. If additivity is required over countable families, Vitali's construction rules out a solution in every dimension. If it is required only over finite families, the line and the plane do admit solutions (the Banach measures), but the Hausdorff and Banach–Tarski paradoxes show that none exist for $n \ge 3$.

To overcome these barriers, standard measure theory abandons the requirement that $\mu$ be defined on all subsets. Instead, Lebesgue measurable sets are used, retaining countable additivity as required by convergence theorems and the axioms of probability.

Alternatively, the axiom of choice may be weakened: in the Solovay model every set of real numbers is measurable. This second route demands more than dropping choice alone, since the Hahn–Banach theorem, which does not need the full axiom, already yields a non-measurable set and even the Banach–Tarski paradox.

== See also ==
- Carathéodory's criterion – Result in measure theory
- Measure (mathematics) – Generalization of mass, length, area and volume
- Outer measure – Mathematical function
