= Product measure =

Construction in measure theory

In mathematics, given two measurable spaces and measures on them, one can obtain a product measurable space and a product measure on that space. Conceptually, this is similar to defining the Cartesian product of sets and the product topology of two topological spaces, except that there can be many natural choices for the product measure.

Let $(X_1, \Sigma_1)$ and $(X_2, \Sigma_2)$ be two measurable spaces, that is, $\Sigma_1$ and $\Sigma_2$ are sigma algebras on $X_1$ and $X_2$ respectively, and let $\mu_1$ and $\mu_2$ be measures on these spaces. Denote by $\Sigma_1 \otimes \Sigma_2$ the sigma algebra on the Cartesian product $X_1 \times X_2$ generated by subsets of the form $B_1 \times B_2$, where $B_1 \in \Sigma_1$ and $B_2 \in \Sigma_2$:

$\Sigma_1 \otimes \Sigma_2 = \sigma\left( \lbrace B_1 \times B_2 \mid B_1 \in \Sigma_1, B_2 \in \Sigma_2 \rbrace \right)$

This sigma algebra is called the product σ-algebra on the product space.

A product measure $\mu_1 \times \mu_2$ (also denoted by $\mu_1 \otimes \mu_2$ by many authors) is defined to be a measure on the measurable space $(X_1 \times X_2, \Sigma_1 \otimes \Sigma_2)$ satisfying the property

$$(\mu_1 \times \mu_2)(B_1 \times B_2) = \mu_1(B_1) \mu_2(B_2) \qquad (B_1 \in \Sigma_1, B_2 \in \Sigma_2)$$.

(In multiplying measures, some of which are infinite, we define the product to be zero if any factor is zero.)

In fact, when the spaces are $\sigma$-finite, the product measure is uniquely defined, and for every measurable set E,

$$(\mu_1 \times \mu_2)(E) = \int_{X_2} \mu_1(E^y)\,d\mu_2(y) = \int_{X_1} \mu_2(E_{x})\,d\mu_1(x),$$

where $E_x = \{y \in X_2 | (x, y) \in E\}$ and $E^y = \{x \in X_1 | (x, y) \in E\}$, which are both measurable sets.

The existence of this measure is guaranteed by the Hahn–Kolmogorov theorem. The uniqueness of product measure is guaranteed only in the case that both $(X_1, \Sigma_1, \mu_1)$ and $(X_2, \Sigma_2, \mu_2)$ are σ-finite.

The Borel measures on the Euclidean space R^{n} can be obtained as the product of n copies of Borel measures on the real line R.

Even if the two factors of the product space are complete measure spaces, the product space may not be. Consequently, the completion procedure is needed to extend the Borel measure into the Lebesgue measure, or to extend the product of two Lebesgue measures to give the Lebesgue measure on the product space.

The opposite construction to the formation of the product of two measures is disintegration, which in some sense "splits" a given measure into a family of measures that can be integrated to give the original measure.

== Examples ==
- Given two measure spaces, there is always a unique maximal product measure μ_{max} on their product, with the property that if μ_{max}(A) is finite for some measurable set A, then μ_{max}(A) = μ(A) for any product measure μ. In particular its value on any measurable set is at least that of any other product measure. This is the measure produced by the Carathéodory extension theorem.
- Sometimes there is also a unique minimal product measure μ_{min}, given by μ_{min}(S) = sup_{A⊂S, μ_{max}(A) finite} μ_{max}(A), where A and S are assumed to be measurable.
- Here is an example where a product has more than one product measure. Take the product X×Y, where X is the unit interval with Lebesgue measure, and Y is the unit interval with counting measure and all sets are measurable. Then, for the minimal product measure the measure of a set is the sum of the measures of its horizontal sections, while for the maximal product measure a set has measure infinity unless it is contained in the union of a countable number of sets of the form A×B, where either A has Lebesgue measure 0 or B is a single point. (In this case the measure may be finite or infinite.) In particular, the diagonal has measure 0 for the minimal product measure and measure infinity for the maximal product measure.

== See also ==
- Fubini's theorem
