= Giuseppe Vitali =

Italian mathematician (1875–1932)

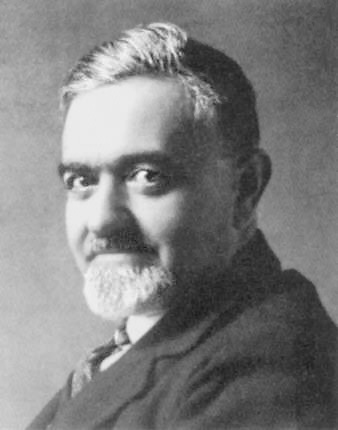
- Born: 26 August 1875; Ravenna, Italy
- Died: 29 February 1932 (aged 56); Bologna, Italy
- Known for: Vitali set; Vitali convergence theorem; Vitali covering theorem; Vitali–Carathéodory theorem; Vitali–Hahn–Saks theorem; Lebesgue–Vitali theorem
- Scientific career
- Fields: Mathematics

Giuseppe Vitali (26 August 1875 – 29 February 1932) was an Italian mathematician who worked in several branches of mathematical analysis. He gives his name to several entities in mathematics, most notably the Vitali set with which he was the first to give an example of a non-measurable subset of real numbers.

== Biography ==
Giuseppe Vitali was the eldest of five children. His father, Domenico Vitali, worked for a railway company in Ravenna while his mother, Zenobia Casadio, was able to stay at home and look after her children.

He completed his elementary education in Ravenna in 1886, and then spent three years at the Ginnasio Comunale in Ravenna where his performance in the final examinations of 1889 was average.

He continued his secondary education in Ravenna at the Dante Alighieri High School. There his mathematics teacher was Giuseppe Nonni who quickly realised the young Giuseppe had great potential. He wrote to Giuseppe's father, in a letter dated 28 June 1895, asking that he allow his son to pursue further studies in mathematics.

He became a student of the Scuola Normale Superiore in Pisa and graduated to the University of Pisa in 1899. He spent two years as assistant before leaving the academic world. From 1901 to 1922 he taught in secondary schools, first in Sassari, then Voghera and then from 1904 at the Classical High School Christopher Columbus in Genoa. In those years he was involved in politics as a member of the Italian Socialist Party until it was forcibly disbanded by the fascists in 1922. His pursuit of mathematical analysis then led him to almost total social isolation. In 1923 he won a position as professor of calculus at the University of Modena and Reggio Emilia . He also taught at the Universities of Padua (1924 to 1925) and Bologna (from 1930). He was an invited speaker at the International Congress of Mathematicians held in Bologna in September 1928, giving the lecture Rapporti inattesi su alcuni rami della matematica (Unexpected relationships of some branches of mathematics).

From 1926 Vitali developed a serious illness and suffered a paralysed arm, meaning he could no longer write. Despite this about half his research papers were written in the last four years of his life.

On 29 February 1932 he delivered a lecture at the University of Bologna and was walking in conversation with fellow mathematician Ettore Bortolotti when he collapsed and died in the street. He was aged 56.

Vitali published a remarkable volume of mathematics over his career with his most significant output taking place in the first eight years of the twentieth century.

He was honoured with election to the Academy of Sciences of Turin in 1928, to the Accademia Nazionale dei Lincei in 1930, and to the Academy of Bologna in 1931.

== Mathematical contributions ==
In 1905 Vitali was the first to give an example of a non-measurable subset of real numbers, see Vitali set. His covering theorem is a fundamental result in measure theory. He also proved several theorems concerning convergence of sequences of measurable and holomorphic functions. The Vitali convergence theorem generalizes Lebesgue's dominated convergence theorem. Another theorem bearing his name gives a sufficient condition for the uniform convergence of a sequence of holomorphic functions on an open domain. This result has been generalized to normal families of meromorphic functions, holomorphic functions of several complex variables, and so on.

In the last part of his life, he also worked on absolute differential calculus and on the geometry of Hilbert spaces.

== Selected works ==
A selection of the mathematical papers of Giuseppe Vitali, precisely 35 out of 83 total, some lecture notes from his university courses, a book on the geometry of Hilbert spaces and 100 letters out of 300 total of his correspondence with many other mathematicians of his time are collected in the book (Vitali 1984).

- Vitali, Giuseppe (1908) [17 December 1907], "Sui gruppi di punti e sulle funzioni di variabili reali", Atti dell'Accademia delle Scienze di Torino (in Italian), 43: 75–92, JFM 39.0101.05. (Title translation) "On groups of points and functions of real variables" is the paper containing the first proof of Vitali covering theorem.
- Vitali, Giuseppe (December 1917), "Eugenio Elia Levi", Bollettino della Mathesis (in Italian), 9: 86–89.
- Vitali, Giuseppe (1984), Opere sull'analisi reale e complessa – Carteggio [Works on real and complex analysis – Correspondence], Opere dei Grandi Matematici Italiani, Florence: Edizioni Cremonese (distributed by Unione Matematica Italiana), pp. XII+524, MR 0777329, Zbl 0578.01033.
