= Carathéodory's criterion =

Result in measure theory

In mathematics, Carathéodory's criterion is a result in measure theory that characterizes when a set is Lebesgue measurable. It was first formulated by Constantin Carathéodory.

== Statement ==
Let ${\mathcal P}(\R^n)$ denote the power set of $\R^n$, and $\lambda^* : \mathcal{P}(\R^n) \to [0, \infty]$ the Lebesgue outer measure on $\R^n$. Let $M \subseteq \R^n$. Then $M$ is Lebesgue measurable if and only if $\lambda^*(S) = \lambda^*(S \cap M) + \lambda^*\left(S \cap M^c\right)$ for every $S \subseteq \R^n,$ where $M^c$ denotes the complement of $M$. Notice that $S$ is not required to be a measurable set.

=== Generalization ===
The Carathéodory criterion is of considerable importance because, in contrast to Lebesgue's original formulation of measurability, which relies on certain topological properties of $\R$, this criterion readily generalizes to a characterization of measurability in abstract spaces. Indeed, in the generalization to abstract measures, this theorem is sometimes stated as a definition of measurability. Thus, we have the following definition: if $\mu^* : {\mathcal P}(\Omega) \to [0, \infty]$ is an outer measure on a set $\Omega,$ where ${\mathcal P}(\Omega)$ denotes the power set of $\Omega,$ then a subset $M \subseteq \Omega$ is called μ^{*}–measurable or Carathéodory measurable if for every $S \subseteq \Omega,$ the equality
$$\mu^*(S) = \mu^*(S \cap M) + \mu^*\left(S \cap M^c\right)$$
holds, where $M^c = \Omega \setminus M$ is the complement of $M$.

The family of all $\mu^*$–measurable subsets is a σ-algebra (so for instance, the complement of a $\mu^*$–measurable set is $\mu^*$–measurable, and the same is true of countable intersections and unions of $\mu^*$–measurable sets) and the restriction of the outer measure $\mu^*$ to this family is a measure.

== See also ==
- Carathéodory's extension theorem – Theorem extending pre-measures to measures
- Non-Borel set – Class of mathematical sets
- Non-measurable set – Set with no meaningful size
- Outer measure – Mathematical function
- Vitali set – Set of real numbers that is not Lebesgue measurable
