= Miklós Laczkovich =

Hungarian mathematician

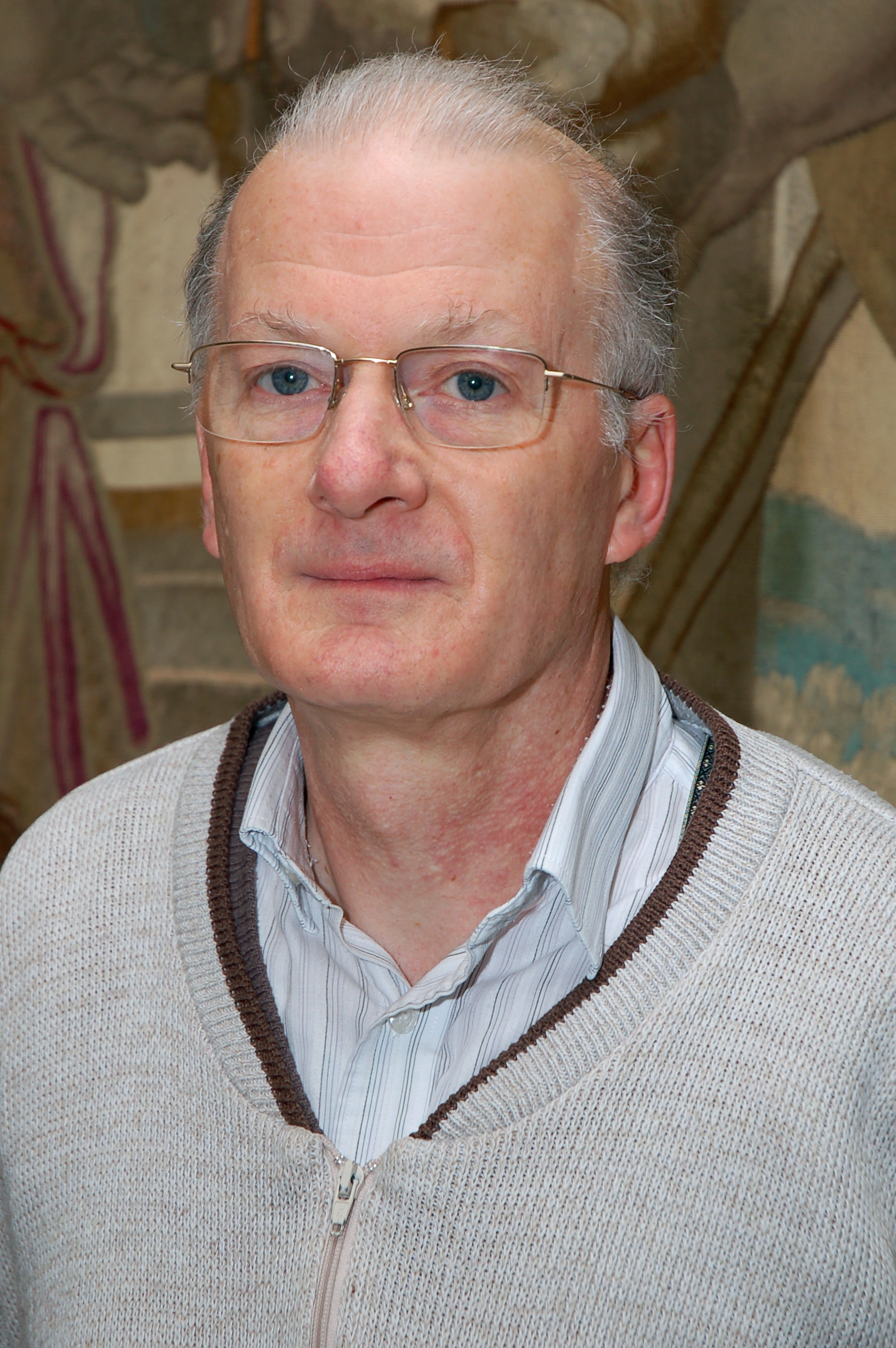
- Laczkovich in 2011
- Born: February 21, 1948
- Education: Eötvös Loránd University (Phd 1974)
- Known for: solving Tarski's circle-squaring problem
- Awards: Ostrowski Prize (1993) Széchenyi Prize (1998)
- Scientific career
- Fields: Mathematics
- Thesis: Separation of sets by derivatives (1974)
- Doctoral advisor: György Petruska

Miklós Laczkovich (born 21 February 1948) is a Hungarian mathematician mainly noted for his work on real analysis and geometric measure theory. His most famous result is the solution of Tarski's circle-squaring problem in 1989.

== Career ==
Laczkovich received his degree in mathematics in 1971 at Eötvös Loránd University, where he has been teaching ever since, currently leading the Department of Analysis. He was also a professor at University College London, where he is now a professor emeritus. He became corresponding member (1993), then member (1998) of the Hungarian Academy of Sciences. He has held several guest professor positions in the UK, Canada, Italy and the United States.

Also being a prolific author, he published over 100 papers and two books, one of which, Conjecture and Proof, was an international success. One of his results is the solution of the Kemperman problem: if f is a real function which satisfies 2f(x) ≤ f(x + h) + f(x + 2h) for every h > 0, then f is monotonically increasing.

== Books ==
- Laczkovich, Miklós (2001). Conjecture and proof. Washington, DC: Mathematical Association of America. ISBN 0-88385-722-7. OCLC 48784322.

== Honours ==
- Ostrowski Prize (1993)
- Member of the Hungarian Academy of Sciences (corresponding: 1993, full: 1998)
- Széchenyi Prize (1998)

== Trivium ==
Laczkovich enjoys and performs classical music; he has been active in various choirs in the past decades.
