= Paradoxical set =

The Banach–Tarski paradox is that a ball can be decomposed into a finite number of point sets and reassembled into two balls identical to the original.

In set theory, a paradoxical set is a set that has a paradoxical decomposition. A paradoxical decomposition of a set is two families of disjoint subsets, along with appropriate group actions that act on some universe (of which the set in question is a subset), such that each partition can be mapped back onto the entire set using only finitely many distinct functions (or compositions thereof) to accomplish the mapping. A set that admits such a paradoxical decomposition where the actions belong to a group $G$ is called $G$-paradoxical or paradoxical with respect to $G$.

Paradoxical sets exist as a consequence of the Axiom of Infinity. Admitting infinite classes as sets is sufficient to allow paradoxical sets.

== Definition ==
Suppose a group $G$ acts on a set $A$. Then $A$ is $G$-paradoxical if there exist some disjoint subsets $A_1,...,A_n,B_1,...,B_m \subseteq A$ and some group elements $g_1,...,g_n,h_1,...,h_m \in G$ such that:

$A = \bigcup_{i=1}^n g_i(A_i)$ and $A = \bigcup_{i=1}^m h_i(B_i)$

== Examples ==
=== Free group ===
The Free group F on two generators a,b has the decomposition $F = \{e\} \cup X(a) \cup X(a^{-1}) \cup X(b) \cup X(b^{-1})$ where e is the identity word and $X(i)$ is the collection of all (reduced) words that start with the letter i. This is a paradoxical decomposition because $X(a) \cup aX(a^{-1}) = F = X(b) \cup bX(b^{-1}).$

=== Banach–Tarski paradox ===
The most famous example of paradoxical sets is the Banach–Tarski paradox, which divides the sphere into paradoxical sets for the special orthogonal group. This result depends on the axiom of choice.

== See also ==
- Pathological (mathematics)
