= Vitali set =

Set of real numbers that is not Lebesgue measurable

In mathematics, a Vitali set is an elementary example of a set of real numbers that is not Lebesgue measurable, found by Giuseppe Vitali in 1905. The Vitali theorem is the existence theorem that there are such sets. Each Vitali set is uncountable, and there are uncountably many Vitali sets. The proof of their existence depends on the axiom of choice.

== Measurable sets ==
Certain sets have a definite 'length' or 'mass'. For instance, the interval $[0,1]$ is deemed to have length $1$; more generally, an interval $[a,b], a \le b$, is deemed to have length $b-a$. If we think of such intervals as metal rods with uniform density, they likewise have well-defined masses. The set $[0,1] \cup [2,3]$ is composed of two intervals of length one, so we take its total length to be $2$. In terms of mass, we have two rods of mass $1$, so the total mass is $2$.

There is a natural question here: if $E$ is an arbitrary subset of the real line, does it have a 'mass' or 'total length'? As an example, we might ask what is the mass of the set of rational numbers between $0$ and $1$, given that the mass of the interval $[0,1]$ is $1$. The rationals are dense in the reals, so any value between and including $0$ and $1$ may appear reasonable.

However, the closest generalization to mass must have the property of countable additivity, which leads us to the Lebesgue measure. It assigns a measure of $b-a$ to the interval $[a,b]$, but will assign a measure of $0$ to the set of rational numbers because a single point has measure zero, and the set of rational numbers comprises a countable infinity of points. Any set which has a well-defined Lebesgue measure is said to be "measurable", but the construction of the Lebesgue measure (for instance using Carathéodory's extension theorem) does not make it obvious whether non-measurable sets exist. The answer to that question involves the axiom of choice.

== Construction and proof ==
A Vitali set is a subset $V$ of the interval $[0,1]$ of real numbers such that, for each real number $r$, there is exactly one number $v \in V$ such that $v-r$ is a rational number. Vitali sets exist because the rational numbers $\mathbb{Q}$ form a normal subgroup of the real numbers $\mathbb{R}$ under addition, and this allows the construction of the additive quotient group $\mathbb{R}/\mathbb{Q}$ of these two groups which is the group formed by the cosets $r+\mathbb{Q}$ of the rational numbers as a subgroup of the real numbers under addition. This group $\mathbb{R}/\mathbb{Q}$ consists of disjoint "shifted copies" of $\mathbb{Q}$ in the sense that each element of this quotient group is a set of the form $r+\mathbb{Q}$ for some $r$ in $\mathbb{R}$. The uncountably many elements of $\mathbb{R}/\mathbb{Q}$ partition $\mathbb{R}$ into disjoint sets, and each element is dense in $\mathbb{R}$. Each element of $\mathbb{R}/\mathbb{Q}$ intersects $[0,1]$, and the axiom of choice guarantees the existence of a subset of $[0,1]$ containing exactly one representative out of each element of $\mathbb{R}/\mathbb{Q}$. A set formed this way is called a Vitali set.

Every Vitali set $V$ is uncountable, and $v-u$ is irrational for any $u,v \in V, u \neq v$.

=== Non-measurability ===
A possible enumeration of the positive rational numbers

A Vitali set is non-measurable. To show this, we assume that $V$ is measurable and we derive a contradiction. Let $q_1,q_2,\dots$ be an enumeration of the rational numbers in $[-1,1]$ (recall that the rational numbers are countable). From the construction of $V$, we can show that the translated sets $V_k=V+q_k=\{v+q_k : v \in V\}$, $k=1,2,\dots$ are pairwise disjoint. (If not, then there exists distinct $v,u \in V$ and $k,\ell \in \mathbb{N}$ such that $v+q_k = u + q_{\ell} \implies v-u = q_{\ell}-q_k \in \mathbb{Q}$, a contradiction.)

Next, note that

$$[0,1]\subseteq\bigcup_k V_k\subseteq[-1,2].$$

To see the first inclusion, consider any real number $r$ in $[0,1]$ and let $v$ be the representative in $V$ for the equivalence class $[r]$; then $r-v=q_i$ for some rational number $q_i$ in $[-1,1]$ which implies that $r$ is in $V_i$.

Apply the Lebesgue measure to these inclusions using sigma additivity:

$$1 \leq \sum_{k=1}^\infty \lambda(V_k) \leq 3.$$

Because the Lebesgue measure is translation invariant, $\lambda(V_k) = \lambda(V)$ and therefore

$$1 \leq \sum_{k=1}^\infty \lambda(V) \leq 3.$$

But this is impossible. Summing infinitely many copies of the constant $\lambda(V)$ yields either zero or infinity, according to whether the constant is zero or positive. In neither case is the sum in $[1,3]$. So $V$ cannot have been measurable after all, i.e., the Lebesgue measure $\lambda$ must not define any value for $\lambda(V)$.

== Properties ==
No Vitali set has the property of Baire.

By modifying the above proof, one shows that each Vitali set has Banach measure $0$. This does not create any contradictions since Banach measures are not countably additive, but only finitely additive.

== Role of the axiom of choice ==
The construction of Vitali sets given above uses the axiom of choice. The question arises: is the axiom of choice needed to prove the existence of sets that are not Lebesgue measurable? The answer is yes, provided that inaccessible cardinals are consistent with the most common axiomatization of set theory, so-called ZFC.

In 1964, Robert Solovay constructed a model of Zermelo–Fraenkel set theory without the axiom of choice where all sets of real numbers are Lebesgue measurable. This is known as the Solovay model. In his proof, Solovay assumed that the existence of inaccessible cardinals is consistent with the other axioms of Zermelo-Fraenkel set theory, i.e. that it creates no contradictions. This assumption is widely believed to be true by set theorists, but it cannot be proven in ZFC alone.

In 1980, Saharon Shelah proved that it is not possible to establish Solovay's result without his assumption on inaccessible cardinals.

== See also ==
- Banach–Tarski paradox – Theorem in set-theoretic geometry
- Carathéodory's criterion – Part of measure theory mathematics
- Non-measurable set – Set with no meaningful size
- Outer measure – Mathematical function
- Infinite parity function – Function in Boolean algebra

== Bibliography ==
- Herrlich, Horst (2006). Axiom of Choice. Springer. p. 120. ISBN 9783540309895.
- Vitali, Giuseppe (1905). "Sul problema della misura dei gruppi di punti di una retta". Bologna, Tip. Gamberini e Parmeggiani.
