= Vitali–Carathéodory theorem =

In mathematics, the Vitali–Carathéodory theorem is a result in real analysis that shows that, under the conditions stated below, integrable functions can be approximated in L^{1} from above and below by lower- and upper-semicontinuous functions, respectively. It is named after Giuseppe Vitali and Constantin Carathéodory.

== Statement of the theorem ==
Let X be a locally compact Hausdorff space equipped with a Borel measure, μ, that is finite on every compact set, outer regular, and tight when restricted to any Borel set that is open or of finite mass. If f is an element of L^{1}(μ) then, for every ε > 0, there are functions u and v on X such that u ≤ f ≤ v, u is upper-semicontinuous and bounded above, v is lower-semicontinuous and bounded below, and

$$\int_X (v - u) \,\mathrm{d}\mu < \varepsilon.$$
