= Null set =

Measurable set whose measure is zero

The Sierpiński triangle is an example of a null set of points in $\mathbb R^2$.

In mathematical analysis, a null set in $\mathbb R$ is a Lebesgue measurable set of real numbers that has measure zero. This can be characterized as a set that can be covered by a countable union of intervals of arbitrarily small total length.

A null set is not to be confused with the empty set as defined in set theory. Although the empty set has Lebesgue measure zero, there are also non-empty sets which are null. For example, any non-empty countable set of real numbers has Lebesgue measure zero and therefore is null.

More generally, on a given measure space $M = (X, \Sigma, \mu)$ a null set is a set $S \in \Sigma$ such that $\mu(S) = 0.$

== Examples ==
Every finite or countably infinite subset of the real numbers $\R$ is a null set. For example, the set of natural numbers $\N$, the set of rational numbers $\Q$ and the set of algebraic numbers $\mathbb A$ are all countably infinite and therefore are null sets when considered as subsets of the real numbers.

The Cantor set is an example of an uncountable null set. It is uncountable because it contains all real numbers between 0 and 1 whose ternary expansion can be written using only 0s and 2s (see Cantor's diagonal argument), and it is null because it is constructed by beginning with the closed interval of real numbers from 0 to 1 and iteratively removing a third of the previous set, thereby multiplying the length by 2/3 with every step.

The set of Liouville numbers is another example of an uncountable null set.

== Definition for Lebesgue measure ==
The Lebesgue measure is the standard way of assigning a length, area or volume to subsets of Euclidean space.

A subset $N$ of the real line $\Reals$ has null Lebesgue measure and is considered to be a null set (also known as a set of zero-content) in $\Reals$ if and only if:

Given any positive number $\varepsilon,$ there is a sequence $I_1, I_2, \ldots$ of intervals in $\Reals$ (where interval $I_n = (a_n, b_n) \subseteq \Reals$ has length $\operatorname{length}(I_n) = b_n - a_n$) such that $N$ is contained in the union of the $I_1, I_2, \ldots$ and the total length of the union is less than $\varepsilon;$ i.e.,
$$N \subseteq \bigcup_{n=1}^\infty I_n \ ~\textrm{and}~ \ \sum_{n=1}^\infty \operatorname{length}(I_n) < \varepsilon \,.$$

(In terminology of mathematical analysis, this definition requires that there be a sequence of open covers of $A$ for which the limit of the lengths of the covers is zero.)

This condition can be generalised to $\Reals^n,$ using $n$-cubes instead of intervals. In fact, the idea can be made to make sense on any manifold, even if there is no Lebesgue measure there.

For instance:

- With respect to $\Reals^n,$ all singleton sets are null, and therefore all countable sets are null. In particular, the set $\Q$ of rational numbers is a null set, despite being dense in $\Reals.$
- The standard construction of the Cantor set is an example of a null uncountable set in $\Reals;$ however other constructions are possible which assign the Cantor set any measure whatsoever.
- All the subsets of $\Reals^n$ whose dimension is smaller than $n$ have null Lebesgue measure in $\Reals^n.$ For instance straight lines or circles are null sets in $\Reals^2.$
- Sard's lemma: the set of critical values of a smooth function has measure zero.

If $\lambda$ is Lebesgue measure for $\Reals$ and π is Lebesgue measure for $\Reals^2$, then the product measure $\lambda \times \lambda = \pi.$ In terms of null sets, the following equivalence has been styled a Fubini's theorem:

- For $A \subset \Reals^2$ and $A_x = \{y : (x , y) \isin A\},$
  $$\pi(A) = 0 \iff \lambda \left(\left\{x : \lambda\left(A_x\right) > 0\right\}\right) = 0.$$

== Measure-theoretic properties ==
Let $(X,\Sigma,\mu)$ be a measure space. We have:

- $\mu(\varnothing) = 0$ (by definition of $\mu$).
- Any countable union of null sets is itself a null set (by countable subadditivity of $\mu$).
- Any (measurable) subset of a null set is itself a null set (by monotonicity of $\mu$).

Together, these facts show that the null sets of $(X,\Sigma,\mu)$ form a 𝜎-ideal of the 𝜎-algebra $\Sigma$. Accordingly, null sets may be interpreted as negligible sets, yielding a measure-theoretic notion of "almost everywhere".

== Uses ==
Null sets play a key role in the definition of the Lebesgue integral: if functions $f$ and $g$ are equal except on a null set, then $f$ is integrable if and only if $g$ is, and their integrals are equal. This motivates the formal definition of $L^p$ spaces as sets of equivalence classes of functions which differ only on null sets.

A measure in which all subsets of null sets are measurable is complete. Any non-complete measure can be completed to form a complete measure by asserting that subsets of null sets have measure zero. Lebesgue measure is an example of a complete measure; in some constructions, it is defined as the completion of a non-complete Borel measure.

=== A subset of the Cantor set which is not Borel measurable ===
The Borel measure is not complete. One simple construction is to start with the standard Cantor set $K,$ which is closed hence Borel measurable, and which has measure zero, and to find a subset $F$ of $K$ which is not Borel measurable. (Since the Lebesgue measure is complete, this $F$ is of course Lebesgue measurable.)

First, we have to know that every set of positive measure contains a nonmeasurable subset. Let $f$ be the Cantor function, a continuous function which is locally constant on $K^c,$ and monotonically increasing on $[0, 1],$ with $f(0) = 0$ and $f(1) = 1.$ Obviously, $f(K^c)$ is countable, since it contains one point per component of $K^c.$ Hence $f(K^c)$ has measure zero, so $f(K)$ has measure one. We need a strictly monotonic function, so consider $g(x) = f(x) + x.$ Since $g$ is strictly monotonic and continuous, it is a homeomorphism. Furthermore, $g(K)$ has measure one. Let $E \subseteq g(K)$ be non-measurable, and let $F = g^{-1}(E).$ Because $g$ is injective, we have that $F \subseteq K,$ and so $F$ is a null set. However, if it were Borel measurable, then $f(F)$ would also be Borel measurable (here we use the fact that the preimage of a Borel set by a continuous function is measurable; $g(F) = (g^{-1})^{-1}(F)$ is the preimage of $F$ through the continuous function $h = g^{-1}$). Therefore $F$ is a null, but non-Borel measurable set.

== Haar null sets ==
In a separable Banach space $(X, \|\cdot\|),$ addition moves any subset $A \subseteq X$ to the translates $A + x$ for any $x \in X.$ When there is a probability measure μ on the σ-algebra of Borel subsets of $X,$ such that for all $x,$ $\mu(A + x) = 0,$ then $A$ is a Haar null set.

The term refers to the null invariance of the measures of translates, associating it with the complete invariance found with Haar measure.

Some algebraic properties of topological groups have been related to the size of subsets and Haar null sets. Haar null sets have been used in Polish groups to show that when A is not a meagre set then $A^{-1} A$ contains an open neighborhood of the identity element. This property is named for Hugo Steinhaus since it is the conclusion of the Steinhaus theorem.
