= Banach measure =

Concept in measure theory

In the mathematical discipline of measure theory, a Banach measure is a certain way to assign a size (or area) to all subsets of the Euclidean plane, consistent with but extending the commonly used Lebesgue measure. While there are certain subsets of the plane which are not Lebesgue measurable, all subsets of the plane have a Banach measure. On the other hand, the Lebesgue measure is countably additive while a Banach measure is only finitely additive (and is therefore known as a "content").

Stefan Banach proved the existence of Banach measures in 1923. This established in particular that paradoxical decompositions as provided by the Banach-Tarski paradox in Euclidean space R^{3} cannot exist in the Euclidean plane R^{2}.

== Definition ==
A Banach measure on R^{n} is a function $\mu: {\mathcal P}(\R^n)\to [0,\infty]$ (assigning a non-negative extended real number to each subset of R^{n}) such that

- μ is finitely additive, i.e. $\mu(A \cup B) = \mu(A)+ \mu(B)$ for any two disjoint sets $A,B\subseteq \R^n$;
- μ extends the Lebesgue measure λ, i.e. $\mu(A)=\lambda(A)$ for every Lebesgue-measurable set $A\subseteq \R^n$;
- μ is invariant under isometries of R^{n} , i.e. $\mu(A)=\mu(f(A))$ for every $A\subseteq \R^n$ and every isometry $f : \R^n\to\R^n$.

== Properties ==
The finite additivity of μ implies that $\mu(\varnothing) = 0$ and $\mu(A_1 \cup \cdots \cup A_k) = \sum_{i=1}^k\mu(A_i)$ for any pairwise disjoint sets $A_1,\ldots,A_k\subseteq \R^n$. We also have $\mu(A)\leq\mu(B)$ whenever $A\subseteq B\subseteq \R^n$.

Since μ extends Lebesgue measure, we know that $\mu(A)=0$ whenever A is a finite or a countable set and that $\mu([a_1,b_1]\times \cdots \times [a_n,b_n]) =(b_1-a_1)\cdots(b_n-a_n)$ for any product of intervals $[a_1,b_1]\times \cdots \times [a_n,b_n]\subseteq \R^n$.

Since μ is invariant under isometries, it is in particular invariant under rotations and translations.

== Results ==
Stefan Banach showed that Banach measures exist on R^{1} and on R^{2}. These results can be derived from the fact that the groups of isometries of R^{1} and of R^{2} are solvable.

The existence of these measures proves the impossibility of a Banach–Tarski paradox in one or two dimensions: it is not possible to decompose a one- or two-dimensional set of finite Lebesgue measure into finitely many sets that can be reassembled into a set with a different Lebesgue measure, because this would violate the properties of the Banach measure that extends the Lebesgue measure.

Conversely, the existence of the Banach-Tarski paradox in all dimensions n ≥ 3 shows that no Banach measure can exist in these dimensions.

As Vitali's paradox shows, Banach measures cannot be strengthened to countably additive ones: there exist subsets of R^{n} that are not Lebesgue measurable, for all n ≥ 1.

Most of these results depend on some form of the axiom of choice. Using only the axioms of Zermelo-Fraenkel set theory without the axiom of choice, it is not possible to derive the Banach-Tarski paradox, nor it is possible to prove the existence of sets that are not Lebesgue-measurable (the latter claim depends on a fairly weak and widely believed assumption, namely that the existence of inaccessible cardinals is consistent). The existence of Banach measures on R^{1} and on R^{2} can also not be proven in the absence of the axiom of choice. In particular, no concrete formula for these Banach measures can be given.
