= Outer measure =

Mathematical function

In the mathematical field of measure theory, an outer measure or exterior measure is a function defined on all subsets of a given set with values in the extended real numbers satisfying some additional technical conditions. The theory of outer measures was first introduced by Constantin Carathéodory to provide an abstract basis for the theory of measurable sets and countably additive measures. Carathéodory's work on outer measures found many applications in measure-theoretic set theory (outer measures are for example used in the proof of the fundamental Carathéodory's extension theorem), and was used in an essential way by Hausdorff to define a dimension-like metric invariant now called Hausdorff dimension. Outer measures are commonly used in the field of geometric measure theory.

Measures are generalizations of length, area and volume, but are useful for much more abstract and irregular sets than intervals in $\mathbb{R}$ or balls in $\mathbb{R}^{3}$. One might expect to define a generalized measuring function $\varphi$ on $\mathbb{R}$ that fulfills the following requirements:

1. Any interval of reals $[a,b]$ has measure $b-a$
2. The measuring function $\varphi$ is a non-negative extended real-valued function defined for all subsets of $\mathbb{R}$.
3. Translation invariance: For any set $A$ and any real $x$, the sets $A$ and $A+x=\{ a+x: a\in A\}$ have the same measure
4. Countable additivity: for any sequence $(A_j)$ of pairwise disjoint subsets of $\mathbb{R}$
  $$\varphi\left(\bigcup_{i=1}^\infty A_i\right) = \sum_{i=1}^\infty \varphi(A_i).$$

It turns out that these requirements are incompatible conditions; see non-measurable set. The purpose of constructing an outer measure on all subsets of $X$ is to pick out a class of subsets (to be called measurable) in such a way as to satisfy the countable additivity property.

== Outer measures ==
Given a set $X,$ let $2^X$ denote the collection of all subsets of $X,$ including the empty set $\varnothing.$ An outer measure on $X$ is a set function
$$\mu: 2^X \to [0, \infty]$$
such that

- null empty set: $\mu(\varnothing) = 0$
- countably subadditive: for arbitrary subsets $A, B_1, B_2, \ldots$ of $X,$
  $$\text{if } A \subseteq \bigcup_{j=1}^\infty B_j \text{ then } \mu(A) \leq \sum_{j=1}^\infty \mu(B_j).$$

Note that there is no subtlety about infinite summation in this definition. Since the summands are all assumed to be nonnegative, the sequence of partial sums could only diverge by increasing without bound. So the infinite sum appearing in the definition will always be a well-defined element of $[0, \infty].$ If, instead, an outer measure were allowed to take negative values, its definition would have to be modified to take into account the possibility of non-convergent infinite sums.

An alternative and equivalent definition. Some textbooks, such as Halmos (1950) and Folland (1999), instead define an outer measure on $X$ to be a function $\mu: 2^X \to [0, \infty]$ such that

- null empty set: $\mu(\varnothing) = 0$
- monotone: if $A$ and $B$ are subsets of $X$ with $A \subseteq B,$ then $\mu(A) \leq \mu(B)$
- for arbitrary subsets $B_1, B_2, \ldots$ of $X,$
  $$\mu\left(\bigcup_{j=1}^\infty B_j\right) \leq \sum_{j=1}^\infty \mu(B_j).$$

Proof of equivalence.
Suppose that $\mu$ is an outer measure in sense originally given above. If $A$ and $B$ are subsets of $X$ with $A \subseteq B,$ then by appealing to the definition with $B_1 = B$ and $B_j = \varnothing$ for all $j \geq 2,$ one finds that $\mu(A) \leq \mu(B).$ The third condition in the alternative definition is immediate from the trivial observation that $\cup_j B_j \subseteq \cup_j B_j.$

Suppose instead that $\mu$ is an outer measure in the alternative definition. Let $A, B_1, B_2, \ldots$ be arbitrary subsets of $X,$ and suppose that
$$A \subseteq \bigcup_{j=1}^\infty B_j.$$
One then has
$$\mu(A) \leq \mu\left(\bigcup_{j=1}^\infty B_j\right) \leq \sum_{j=1}^\infty\mu(B_j),$$
with the first inequality following from the second condition in the alternative definition, and the second inequality following from the third condition in the alternative definition. So $\mu$ is an outer measure in the sense of the original definition.

== Measurability of sets relative to an outer measure ==
Let $X$ be a set with an outer measure $\mu.$ One says that a subset $E$ of $X$ is $\mu$-measurable (sometimes called Carathéodory-measurable relative to $\mu$, after the mathematician Carathéodory) if and only if
$$\mu(A) = \mu(A \cap E) + \mu(A \setminus E)$$
for every subset $A$ of $X.$

Informally, this says that a $\mu$-measurable subset is one which may be used as a building block, breaking any other subset apart into pieces (namely, the piece which is inside of the measurable set together with the piece which is outside of the measurable set). In terms of the motivation for measure theory, one would expect that area, for example, should be an outer measure on the plane. One might then expect that every subset of the plane would be deemed "measurable," following the expected principle that
$$\operatorname{area}(A \cup B) = \operatorname{area}(A) + \operatorname{area}(B)$$
whenever $A$ and $B$ are disjoint subsets of the plane. However, the formal logical development of the theory shows that the situation is more complicated. A formal implication of the axiom of choice is that for any definition of area as an outer measure which includes as a special case the standard formula for the area of a rectangle, there must be subsets of the plane which fail to be measurable. In particular, the above "expected principle" is false, provided that one accepts the axiom of choice.

=== The measure space associated to an outer measure ===
It is straightforward to use the above definition of $\mu$-measurability to see that

- if $A \subseteq X$ is $\mu$-measurable then its complement $X \setminus A \subseteq X$ is also $\mu$-measurable.

The following condition is known as the "countable additivity of $\mu$ on measurable subsets."

- if $A_1, A_2, \ldots$ are $\mu$-measurable pairwise-disjoint ($A_i \cap A_j=\emptyset$ for $i\neq j$) subsets of $X$, then one has
  $$\mu\Big(\bigcup_{j=1}^\infty A_j\Big) = \sum_{j=1}^\infty\mu(A_j).$$

Proof of countable additivity.
One automatically has the conclusion in the form "$\,\leq\,$" from the definition of outer measure. So it is only necessary to prove the "$\,\geq\,$" inequality. One has
$$\mu\Big(\bigcup_{j=1}^\infty A_j\Big)\geq\mu\Big(\bigcup_{j=1}^N A_j\Big)$$
for any positive number $N,$ due to the second condition in the "alternative definition" of outer measure given above. Suppose (inductively) that
$$\mu\Big(\bigcup_{j=1}^{N-1} A_j\Big)=\sum_{j=1}^{N-1}\mu(A_j)$$

Applying the above definition of $\mu$-measurability with $A = A_1 \cup \cdots \cup A_N$ and with $E = A_N,$ one has
$$\begin{align}
\mu\Big(\bigcup_{j=1}^N A_j\Big) &= \mu\left(\Big(\bigcup_{j=1}^N A_j\Big)\cap A_N\right) + \mu\left(\Big(\bigcup_{j=1}^N A_j\Big)\smallsetminus A_N\right) \\
&= \mu(A_N) + \mu\Big(\bigcup_{j=1}^{N-1}A_j\Big)
\end{align}$$
which closes the induction. Going back to the first line of the proof, one then has
$$\mu\Big(\bigcup_{j=1}^\infty A_j\Big)\geq\sum_{j=1}^N \mu(A_j)$$
for any positive integer $N.$ One can then send $N$ to infinity to get the required "$\,\geq\,$" inequality.

A similar proof shows that:

- if $A_1, A_2, \ldots$ are $\mu$-measurable subsets of $X,$ then the union $\bigcup_{i=1}^\infty A_i$ and intersection $\bigcap_{i=1}^\infty A_i$ are also $\mu$-measurable.

The properties given here can be summarized by the following terminology:

Given any outer measure $\mu$ on a set $X,$ the collection of all $\mu$-measurable subsets of $X$ is a σ-algebra. The restriction of $\mu$ to this $\sigma$-algebra is a measure.

One thus has a measure space structure on $X,$ arising naturally from the specification of an outer measure on $X.$ This measure space has the additional property of completeness, which is contained in the following statement:

- Every subset $A \subseteq X$ such that $\mu(A) = 0$ is $\mu$-measurable.

This is easy to prove by using the second property in the "alternative definition" of outer measure.

== Restriction and pushforward of an outer measure ==
Let $\mu$ be an outer measure on the set $X$.

=== Pushforward ===
Given another set $Y$ and a map $f:X\to Y$ define $f_\# \mu : 2^Y \to [0, \infty]$ by
$$\big(f_\#\mu\big)(A)=\mu\big(f^{-1}(A)\big).$$
One can verify directly from the definitions that $f_\# \mu$ is an outer measure on $Y$.

=== Restriction ===
Let B be a subset of X. Define μ_{B} : 2^{X}→[0,∞] by
$$\mu_B(A)=\mu(A\cap B).$$
One can check directly from the definitions that μ_{B} is another outer measure on X.

=== Measurability of sets relative to a pushforward or restriction ===
If a subset A of X is μ-measurable, then it is also μ_{B}-measurable for any subset B of X.

Given a map f : X→Y and a subset A of Y, if f^{−1}(A) is μ-measurable then A is f_{#} μ-measurable. More generally, f^{−1}(A) is μ-measurable if and only if A is f_{#} (μ_{B})-measurable for every subset B of X.

== Regular outer measures ==
=== Definition of a regular outer measure ===
Given a set X, an outer measure μ on X is said to be regular if any subset $A\subseteq X$ can be approximated 'from the outside' by μ-measurable sets. Formally, this is requiring either of the following equivalent conditions:

- $\mu(A)=\inf\{\mu(B)\mid A\subseteq B, B\text{ is μ-measurable}\}$
- There exists a μ-measurable subset B of X which contains A and such that $\mu(B)=\mu(A)$.

It is automatic that the second condition implies the first; the first implies the second by taking the countable intersection of $B_i$ with $\mu(B_i)\to\mu(A)$

=== The regular outer measure associated to an outer measure ===
Given an outer measure μ on a set X, define ν : 2^{X}→[0,∞] by
$$\nu(A)=\inf\Big\{\mu(B):\mu\text{-measurable subsets }B\subset X\text{ with }B\supset A\Big\}.$$
Then ν is a regular outer measure on X which assigns the same measure as μ to all μ-measurable subsets of X. Every μ-measurable subset is also ν-measurable, and every ν-measurable subset of finite ν-measure is also μ-measurable.

So the measure space associated to ν may have a larger σ-algebra than the measure space associated to μ. The restrictions of ν and μ to the smaller σ-algebra are identical. The elements of the larger σ-algebra which are not contained in the smaller σ-algebra have infinite ν-measure and finite μ-measure.

From this perspective, ν may be regarded as an extension of μ.

== Outer measure and topology ==
Suppose (X, d) is a metric space and φ an outer measure on X. If φ has the property that
$$\varphi(E \cup F) = \varphi(E) + \varphi(F)$$
whenever
$$d(E,F) = \inf\{d(x,y): x \in E, y \in F\} > 0,$$
then φ is called a metric outer measure.

Theorem. If φ is a metric outer measure on X, then every Borel subset of X is φ-measurable. (The Borel sets of X are the elements of the smallest σ-algebra generated by the open sets.)

== Construction of outer measures ==
There are several procedures for constructing outer measures on a set. The classic Munroe reference below describes two particularly useful ones which are referred to as Method I and Method II.

=== Method I ===
Let X be a set, C a family of subsets of X which contains the empty set and p a non-negative extended real valued function on C which vanishes on the empty set.

Theorem. Suppose the family C and the function p are as above and define
$$\varphi(E) = \inf \biggl\{ \sum_{i=0}^\infty p(A_i)\,\bigg|\,E\subseteq\bigcup_{i=0}^\infty A_i,\forall i\in\mathbb N , A_i\in C\biggr\}.$$
That is, the infimum extends over all sequences {A_{i}} of elements of C which cover E, with the convention that the infimum is infinite if no such sequence exists. Then φ is an outer measure on X.

=== Method II ===
The second technique is more suitable for constructing outer measures on metric spaces, since it yields metric outer measures. Suppose (X, d) is a metric space. As above C is a family of subsets of X which contains the empty set and p a non-negative extended real valued function on C which vanishes on the empty set. For each δ > 0, let
$$C_\delta= \{A \in C: \operatorname{diam}(A) \leq \delta\}$$
and
$$\varphi_\delta(E) = \inf \biggl\{ \sum_{i=0}^\infty p(A_i)\,\bigg|\,E\subseteq\bigcup_{i=0}^\infty A_i,\forall i\in\mathbb N , A_i\in C_\delta\biggr\}.$$
Obviously, φ_{δ} ≥ φ_{δ'} when δ ≤ δ' since the infimum is taken over a smaller class as δ decreases. Thus
$$\lim_{\delta \rightarrow 0} \varphi_\delta(E) = \varphi_0(E) \in [0, \infty]$$
exists (possibly infinite).

Theorem. φ_{0} is a metric outer measure on X.

This is the construction used in the definition of Hausdorff measures for a metric space.

== See also ==
- Inner measure
