= Sar Sureh, Sistan and Baluchestan =

Village in Sistan and Baluchestan province, Iran

Sar Sureh Persian: سرسوره
- Village
- Location within Iran
- Coordinates: 27°36′49″N 61°33′39″E
- Country: Iran
- Province: Sistan and Baluchestan
- County: Sib and Suran
- District: Paskuh
- Rural District: Sar Sureh

Population (2016)
  - Total: 2,313
- Time zone: UTC+3:30 (IRST)

Sar Sureh (Persian: سرسوره) is a village in, and the capital of, Sar Sureh Rural District of Paskuh District, Sib and Suran County, Sistan and Baluchestan province, Iran.

== Demographics ==
=== Population ===
At the time of the 2006 National Census, the village's population was 1,549 in 347 households, when it was in Paskuh Rural District of the former Sib and Suran District of Saravan County. The following census in 2011 counted 2,043 people in 464 households, by which time the district had been separated from the county in the establishment of Sib and Suran County. The rural district was transferred to the new Central District. The 2016 census measured the population of the village as 2,313 people in 577 households.

After the census, the rural district was separated from the district in the formation of Paskuh District, and Sar Sureh was transferred to Sar Sureh Rural District created in the new district.
