= Sinokan =

Village in Sistan and Baluchestan province, Iran

Sinokan Persian: سینوکان
- Village
- Location within Iran
- Coordinates: 27°38′41″N 62°32′11″E
- Country: Iran
- Province: Sistan and Baluchestan
- County: Golshan
- District: Central
- Rural District: Sinokan

Population (2016)
  - Total: 1,033
- Time zone: UTC+3:30 (IRST)

Sinokan (Persian: سینوکان) is a village in, and the capital of, Sinokan Rural District of the Central District (Note: Formerly Jaleq District of Saravan County) of Golshan County, Sistan and Baluchestan province, Iran.

== Demographics ==
=== Population ===
At the time of the 2006 National Census, the village's population was 1,127 in 218 households, when it was in Nahuk Rural District of Jaleq District (Note: Renamed the Central District of Golshan County) in Saravan County. The following census in 2011 counted 837 people in 177 households. The 2016 census measured the population of the village as 1,033 people in 254 households.

In 2019, the rural district was transferred to the Central District of Saravan County. Jaleq District was separated from the county in the establishment of Golshan County and renamed the Central District. Singan was transferred to Sinokan Rural District created in the district.
