= Shand Ashkandan =

Village in Sistan and Baluchestan province, Iran

Shand Ashkandan Persian: شند اشکندان
- Village
- Location within Iran
- Coordinates: 27°24′16″N 62°45′49″E
- Country: Iran
- Province: Sistan and Baluchestan
- County: Golshan
- District: Kalleh Gan
- Rural District: Shand Ashkandan

Population (2016)
  - Total: 420
- Time zone: UTC+3:30 (IRST)

Shand Ashkandan (Persian: شند اشکندان) is a village in, and the capital of, Shand Ashkandan Rural District of Kalleh Gan District, Golshan County, Sistan and Baluchestan province, Iran.

== Demographics ==
=== Population ===
At the time of the 2011 National Census, the village's population was 275 people in 78 households, when it was in Kalleh Gan Rural District of Jaleq District (Note: Renamed the Central District of Golshan County) in Saravan County. The 2016 census measured the population of the village as 420 people in 126 households.

In 2019, the district was separated from the county in the establishment of Golshan County and renamed the Central District. Shand Ashkandan was transferred to Shand Ashkandan Rural District created in the new Kalleh Gan District.
