= Kahn-e Karim =

Village in Sistan and Baluchestan province, Iran

Kahn-e Karim Persian: کهن کریم
- Village
- Location within Iran
- Coordinates: 27°32′36″N 61°37′52″E
- Country: Iran
- Province: Sistan and Baluchestan
- County: Sib and Suran
- District: Paskuh
- Rural District: Paskuh

Population (2016)
  - Total: 287
- Time zone: UTC+3:30 (IRST)

Kahn-e Karim (Persian: کهن کریم) is a village in, and the capital of, Paskuh Rural District of Paskuh District, Sib and Suran County, Sistan and Baluchestan province, Iran. The previous capital of the rural district was the village of Paskuh.

== Demographics ==
=== Population ===
At the time of the 2006 National Census, the village's population was 1,392 in 281 households, when it was in the former Sib and Suran District of Saravan County. The following census in 2011 counted 931 people in 217 households, by which time the district had been separated from the county in the establishment of Sib and Suran County. The rural district was transferred to the new Central District. The 2016 census measured the population of the village as 287 people in 77 households.

After the census, the rural district was separated from the district in the formation of Paskuh District.
