= Kupak =

Village in Sistan and Baluchestan province, Iran

Kupak Persian: کوپک
- Village
- Location within Iran
- Coordinates: 27°37′37″N 62°20′57″E
- Country: Iran
- Province: Sistan and Baluchestan
- County: Saravan
- District: Central
- Rural District: Nahuk

Population (2016)
  - Total: 1,477
- Time zone: UTC+3:30 (IRST)

Kupak (Persian: کوپک) is a village in Nahuk Rural District of the Central District of Saravan County, Sistan and Baluchestan province, Iran.

== Demographics ==
=== Population ===
At the time of the 2006 National Census, the village's population was 1,615 in 294 households, when it was in Jaleq District (Note: Renamed the Central District of Golshan County) The following census in 2011 counted 1,040 people in 246 households. The 2016 census measured the population of the village as 1,477 people in 401 households. It was the most populous village in its rural district.

The rural district was transferred to the Central District in 2019.
