= Kushkuk-e Nahuk =

Village in Sistan and Baluchestan province, Iran

Kushkuk-e Nahuk Persian: کوشکوک ناهوک
- Village
- Location within Iran
- Coordinates: 27°38′19″N 62°20′27″E
- Country: Iran
- Province: Sistan and Baluchestan
- County: Saravan
- District: Central
- Rural District: Nahuk

Population (2016)
  - Total: 959
- Time zone: UTC+3:30 (IRST)

Kushkuk-e Nahuk (Persian: کوشکوک ناهوک) is a village in, and the capital of, Nahuk Rural District of the Central District of Saravan County, Sistan and Baluchestan province, Iran.

== Demographics ==
=== Population ===
At the time of the 2006 National Census, the village's population was 1,984 in 364 households, when it was in Jaleq District. (Note: Renamed the Central District of Golshan County) The following census in 2011 counted 727 people in 161 households. The 2016 census measured the population of the village as 959 people in 278 households.

The rural district was transferred to the Central District in 2019.
