= Sar Sureh Rural District =

Rural district in Sistan and Baluchestan province, Iran

Sar Sureh Rural District Persian: دهستان سرسوره
- Rural District
- Location within Iran
- Coordinates: 27°45′07″N 61°30′17″E
- Country: Iran
- Province: Sistan and Baluchestan
- County: Sib and Suran
- District: Paskuh
- Capital: Sar Sureh
- Time zone: UTC+3:30 (IRST)

Sar Sureh Rural District (Persian: دهستان سرسوره) is in Paskuh District of Sib and Suran County, Sistan and Baluchestan province, Iran. Its capital is the village of Sar Sureh, whose population at the time of the 2016 National Census was 2,313 in 577 households.

== History ==
After the 2006 census, Hiduj and Sib and Suran Districts were separated from Saravan County in the establishment of Sib and Suran County. After the 2016 census, Paskuh Rural District was separated from the Central District in the formation of Paskuh District, and Sar Sureh Rural District was created in the new district.
