= Kalleh Din =

Village in Sistan and Baluchestan province, Iran

Kalleh Din Persian: کله دین
- Village
- Location within Iran
- Coordinates: 27°29′11″N 62°47′21″E
- Country: Iran
- Province: Sistan and Baluchestan
- County: Golshan
- District: Kalleh Gan
- Rural District: Kalleh Gan

Population (2016)
  - Total: 416
- Time zone: UTC+3:30 (IRST)

Kalleh Din (Persian: کله دین) is a village in, and the capital of, Kalleh Gan Rural District of Kalleh Gan District, Golshan County, Sistan and Baluchestan province, Iran.

== Demographics ==
=== Population ===
At the time of the 2006 National Census, the village's population was 214 in 45 households, when it was in Jaleq District (Note: Renamed the Central District of Golshan County) of Saravan County. The following census in 2011 counted 305 people in 80 households. The 2016 census measured the population of the village as 416 people in 124 households.

In 2019, the district was separated from the county in the establishment of Golshan County and renamed the Central District. The rural district was transferred to the new Kalleh Gan District.
