= Paskuh, Iran =

Village in Sistan and Baluchestan province, Iran

Paskuh Persian: پسکوه
- Village
- Location within Iran
- Coordinates: 27°33′40″N 61°38′19″E
- Country: Iran
- Province: Sistan and Baluchestan
- County: Sib and Suran
- District: Paskuh
- Rural District: Paskuh

Population (2016)
  - Total: 4,048
- Time zone: UTC+3:30 (IRST)

Paskuh (Persian: پسکوه) is a village in, and the former capital of, Paskuh Rural District of Paskuh District, Sib and Suran County, Sistan and Baluchestan province, Iran, serving as capital of the district. The capital of the rural district has been transferred to the village of Kahn-e Karim.

== Demographics ==
=== Population ===
At the time of the 2006 National Census, the village's population was 2,104 in 448 households, when it was in the former Sib and Suran District of Saravan County. The following census in 2011 counted 2,390 people in 523 households, by which time the district had been separated from the county in the establishment of Sib and Suran County. The rural district was transferred to the new Central District. The 2016 census measured the population of the village as 4,048 people in 1,009 households. It was the most populous village in its rural district.

After the census, the rural district was separated from the district in the formation of Paskuh District.
