= Moradabad, Sib and Suran =

Village in Sistan and Baluchestan province, Iran

Moradabad Persian: مرادآباد
- Village
- Location within Iran
- Coordinates: 27°21′33″N 61°52′48″E
- Country: Iran
- Province: Sistan and Baluchestan
- County: Sib and Suran
- District: Central
- Rural District: Shandan

Population (2016)
  - Total: 282
- Time zone: UTC+3:30 (IRST)

Moradabad (Persian: مرادآباد) is a village in, and the capital of, Shandan Rural District of the Central District of Sib and Suran County, Sistan and Baluchestan province, Iran.

== Demographics ==
=== Population ===
At the time of the 2011 National Census, the village's population was 277 people in 68 households, when it was in Sib and Suran Rural District. The 2016 census measured the population of the village as 282 people in 61 households.

After the census, the rural district was transferred to the new Central District, and Moradabad was transferred to Shandan Rural District created in the district.
