= Haqqabad =

Haqqabad or Haqabad (Persian: حق اباد) may refer to:

- Haqqabad, Razavi Khorasan
- Haqqabad, Saravan
- Haqqabad, Sib and Suran
- Haqqabad, Gowhar Kuh, Sistan and Baluchestan
