= Continent (disambiguation) =

A continent is a large landmass.

The Continent is used by those on the periphery of Europe to refer the mainland.

Continent(s) or the continent may also refer to:

== Entertainment and media ==
=== Music ===
- Continent (The Acacia Strain album), 2008
- Continent (CFCF album)
- Continents, 2013 album by The Eclectic Moniker
- Continents (band), Welsh metalcore band

=== Publications ===
- The Continent (digital newspaper), a digital newspaper covering Africa
- Continent (journal), open-access journal founded in 2010
- The Continent (Presbyterian periodical), an American Presbyterian periodical

=== Film ===
- The Continent (film), a 2014 Chinese film

== Science ==
- Continent, in geology a synonym for continental crust

== Other uses ==
- Continent (airline), Russian airline
- Continent (horse), British racehorse

== See also ==
- Continence (disambiguation)
- Continents of the world (template)
- Continental (disambiguation)
- The Continental (disambiguation)
- Continente
