= Kont =

Kont may refer to:

== Places ==
- Ontario International Airport (ICAO airport code KONT), San Bernardino County, California, USA
- Kont Rural District, Hiduj District, Sib and Suran County, Sistan and Baluchestan Province, Iran
- Kont, Iran; a village in Kont Rural District

== Other uses ==
- Kont (Caribbean), a form of oral tradition in the Caribbean
- Kont Bank, a bank in Dushanbe, Tajikistan
- Nicholas Kont (died 1637), Croato-Hungarian nobleman and courtier

== See also ==
- Cont (disambiguation)
