= Khvoshab, Sistan and Baluchestan =

Village in Sistan and Baluchestan province, Iran

Khvoshab Persian: خوشاب
- Village
- Location within Iran
- Coordinates: 28°02′12″N 62°45′38″E
- Country: Iran
- Province: Sistan and Baluchestan
- County: Golshan
- District: Central
- Rural District: Jaleq

Population (2016)
  - Total: 77
- Time zone: UTC+3:30 (IRST)

Khvoshab (Persian: خوشاب) is a village in, and the capital of, Jaleq Rural District of the Central District (Note: Formerly Jaleq District of Saravan County) of Golshan County, Sistan and Baluchestan province, Iran.

== Demographics ==
=== Population ===
At the time of the 2006 National Census, the village's population was 56 in 10 households, when it was in Jaleq District (Note: Renamed the Central District of Golshan County) of Saravan County. The following census in 2011 counted 25 people in 5 households. The 2016 census measured the population of the village as 77 people in 26 households.

In 2019, the district was separated from the county in the establishment of Golshan County and renamed the Central District.
