= Band, Golshan =

Village in Sistan and Baluchestan province, Iran

Band Persian: بند
- Village

- Location within Iran
- Coordinates: 27°25′42″N 62°46′45″E
- Country: Iran
- Province: Sistan and Baluchestan
- County: Golshan
- District: Kalleh Gan
- Rural District: Kalleh Gan

Population (2016)
  - Total: 1,316
- Time zone: UTC+3:30 (IRST)

Band (Persian: بند) is a village in Kalleh Gan Rural District of Kalleh Gan District, Golshan County, Sistan and Baluchestan province, Iran, serving as capital of the district.

== Demographics ==
=== Population ===
At the time of the 2006 National Census, the village's population was 1,015 in 183 households, when it was in Jaleq District (Note: Renamed the Central District of Golshan County) of Saravan County. The following census in 2011 counted 994 people in 233 households. The 2016 census measured the population of the village as 1,316 people in 346 households. It was the most populous village in its rural district.

In 2019, the district was separated from the county in the establishment of Golshan County and renamed the Central District. The rural district was transferred to the new Kalleh Gan District.
