= Kuhak, Sistan and Baluchestan =

Village in Sistan and Baluchestan province, Iran

Kuhak Persian: کوهک
- Village
- Location within Iran
- Coordinates: 27°07′54″N 63°14′23″E
- Country: Iran
- Province: Sistan and Baluchestan
- County: Saravan
- District: Mehregan
- Rural District: Kuhak

Population (2016)
  - Total: 3,201
- Time zone: UTC+3:30 (IRST)

Kuhak (Persian: کوهک) (Note: Also romanized as Kūhak) is a village in, and the capital of, Kuhak Rural District of Mehregan District, Saravan County, Sistan and Baluchestan province, Iran. It is Iran's easternmost village and is close to the Pakistani border. Road 92 passes through it.

== Demographics ==
=== Population ===
At the time of the 2006 National Census, the village's population was 2,990 in 640 households, when it was in Kuhak-e Esfandak Rural District (Note: Renamed Esfandak Rural District) of Bam Pasht District. The following census in 2011 counted 2,425 people in 512 households. The 2016 census measured the population of the village as 3,201 people in 793 households. It was the most populous village in its rural district.

In 2017, the rural district was separated from its parent district during the formation of Mehregan District and renamed Esfandak Rural District. Kuhak was then transferred to the newly created Kuhak Rural District.
