= Paskuh (disambiguation) =

Paskuh (Persian: پسکوه) or its variants may refer to:

- Pas Kuhak, a village in Shiraz County, Fars province
- Pas Kuh, a village in Shirvan County, North Khorasan province
- Pasakuh Rural District, an administrative division of Kalat County, Razavi Khorasan province
- Paskuh, Iran, a village in Sib and Suran County, Sistan and Baluchestan province
- Paskuh Rural District (Sib and Suran County), an administrative division of Sistan and Baluchestan province
- Paskuh Rural District (Qaen County), an administrative division of South Khorasan province
