= Shandan Rural District =

Rural district in Sistan and Baluchestan province, Iran

Shandan Rural District Persian: دهستان شندان
- Rural District
- Location within Iran
- Coordinates: 27°23′52″N 61°49′06″E
- Country: Iran
- Province: Sistan and Baluchestan
- County: Sib and Suran
- District: Central
- Capital: Moradabad
- Time zone: UTC+3:30 (IRST)

Shandan Rural District (Persian: دهستان شندان) is in the Central District of Sib and Suran County, Sistan and Baluchestan province, Iran. Its capital is the village of Moradabad, whose population at the time of the 2016 National Census was 282 people in 61 households.

== History ==
After the 2006 census, Hiduj and Sib and Suran Districts were separated from Saravan County in the establishment of Sib and Suran County. Shandan Rural District was created in the Central District after the 2016 census.
