= Naranu =

Village in Sistan and Baluchestan province, Iran

Naranu Persian: نرانو
- Village
- Location within Iran
- Coordinates: 28°01′07″N 62°42′53″E
- Country: Iran
- Province: Sistan and Baluchestan
- County: Golshan
- District: Central
- Rural District: Jaleq

Population (2016)
  - Total: 718
- Time zone: UTC+3:30 (IRST)

Naranu (Persian: نرانو) is a village in Jaleq Rural District of the Central District (Note: Formerly Jaleq District of Saravan County) of Golshan County, Sistan and Baluchestan province, Iran.

== Demographics ==
=== Population ===
At the time of the 2006 National Census, the village's population was 132 in 30 households, when it was in Jaleq District (Note: Renamed the Central District of Golshan County) of Saravan County. The following census in 2011 counted 124 people in 31 households. The 2016 census measured the population of the village as 718 people in 188 households. It was the most populous village in its rural district.

In 2019, the district was separated from the county in the establishment of Golshan County and renamed the Central District.
