= Kershan-e Pain =

Village in Sistan and Baluchestan province, Iran

Kershan-e Pain Persian: کرشان پایین
- Village
- Location within Iran
- Coordinates: 27°01′09″N 62°13′17″E
- Country: Iran
- Province: Sistan and Baluchestan
- County: Sib and Suran
- District: Hiduj
- Rural District: Hiduj

Population (2016)
  - Total: 1,654
- Time zone: UTC+3:30 (IRST)

Kershan-e Pain (Persian: کرشان پایین) (Note: Also known as Kushan-e Pain (كوشان پائين)) is a village in Hiduj Rural District of Hiduj District, Sib and Suran County, Sistan and Baluchestan province, Iran.

== Demographics ==
=== Population ===
At the time of the 2006 National Census, the village's population was 1,061 in 269 households, when it was in Saravan County. The following census in 2011 counted 1,554 people in 391 households, by which time the district had been separated from the county in the establishment of Sib and Suran County. The 2016 census measured the population of the village as 1,654 people in 389 households. It was the most populous village in its rural district.
