= Haqqabad, Sib and Suran =

Village in Sistan and Baluchestan province, Iran

Haqqabad Persian: حق‌آباد
- Village
- Location within Iran
- Coordinates: 27°41′24″N 61°25′29″E
- Country: Iran
- Province: Sistan and Baluchestan
- County: Sib va Suran
- District: Paskuh
- Rural District: Sar Sureh

Population (2016)
  - Total: 375
- Time zone: UTC+3:30 (IRST)

Haqqabad (Persian: حق‌آباد) is a village in Sar Sureh Rural District of Pskuh District, Sib and Suran County, Sistan and Baluchestan province, Iran.

== Demographics ==
=== Population ===
At the time of the 2006 National Census, the village's population was 375 in 97 households.
