= Aspich =

Aspich آسپیچ
- Village
- Location within Iran
- Country: Iran
- Province: Sistan and Baluchestan
- County: Saravan
- Bakhsh: Central District

Population (2006)
  - Total: 2,819

Aspich, (Persian: آسپیچ) is a village in Central District, Saravan County of Sistan and Baluchestan Province, Iran. At the 2006 census, its population was 2,819 (909 households). Road 92 passes through it.
