= Kont, Iran =

Village in Sistan and Baluchestan province, Iran

Kont Persian: کنت
- Village
- Location within Iran
- Coordinates: 27°00′29″N 61°57′51″E
- Country: Iran
- Province: Sistan and Baluchestan
- County: Sib and Suran
- District: Hiduj
- Rural District: Kont

Population (2016)
  - Total: 3,199
- Time zone: UTC+3:30 (IRST)

Kont (Persian: کنت) is a village in, and the capital of, Kont Rural District of Hiduj District, Sib and Suran County, Sistan and Baluchestan province, Iran.

== Demographics ==
=== Population ===
At the time of the 2006 National Census, the village's population was 2,723 in 633 households, when it was in Saravan County. The following census in 2011 counted 2,880 people in 547 households, by which time the district had been separated from the county in the establishment of Sib and Suran County. The 2016 census measured the population of the village as 3,199 people in 845 households. It was the most populous village in its rural district.
