= Shand Ashkandan Rural District =

Rural district in Sistan and Baluchestan province, Iran

Shand Ashkandan Rural District Persian: دهستان شند اشکندان
- Rural District
- Location within Iran
- Coordinates: 27°20′42″N 62°39′01″E
- Country: Iran
- Province: Sistan and Baluchestan
- County: Golshan
- District: Kalleh Gan
- Capital: Shand Ashkandan
- Time zone: UTC+3:30 (IRST)

Shand Ashkandan Rural District (Persian: دهستان شند اشکندان) is in Kalleh Gan District of Golshan County, Sistan and Baluchestan province, Iran. Its capital is the village of Shand Ashkandan, whose population at the time of the 2016 National Census was 420 people in 126 households.

== History ==
In 2019, Jaleq District (Note: Renamed the Central District of Golshan County) was separated from Saravan County in the establishment of Golshan County and renamed the Central District. Shand Ashkandan Rural District was created in the new Kalleh Gan District.
