= Gidbast =

Village in Sistan and Baluchestan province, Iran

Gidbast Persian: گیدبست
- Village
- Location within Iran
- Coordinates: 28°00′38″N 61°38′46″E
- Country: Iran
- Province: Sistan and Baluchestan
- County: Saravan
- District: Central
- Rural District: Gosht

Population (2016)
  - Total: 441
- Time zone: UTC+3:30 (IRST)

Gidbast (Persian: گیدبست) is a village in Gosht Rural District of the Central District of Saravan County, Sistan and Baluchestan province, Iran.

== Demographics ==
=== Population ===
At the time of the 2006 National Census, the village's population was 399 in 83 households. The following census in 2011 counted 171 people in 34 households. The 2016 census measured the population of the village as 441 people in 84 households. It was the most populous village in its rural district.
