= Metric outer measure =

In mathematics, a metric outer measure is an outer measure μ defined on the subsets of a given metric space (X, d) such that

$$\mu (A \cup B) = \mu (A) + \mu (B)$$

for every pair of positively separated subsets A and B of X.

== Construction of metric outer measures ==
Let τ : Σ → [0, +∞] be a set function defined on a class Σ of subsets of X containing the empty set ∅, such that τ(∅) = 0. One can show that the set function μ defined by

$$\mu (E) = \lim_{\delta \to  0} \mu_{\delta} (E),$$

where

$$\mu_{\delta} (E) = \inf \left\{ \left. \sum_{i = 1}^{\infty} \tau (C_{i}) \right| C_{i} \in \Sigma, \operatorname{diam} (C_{i}) \leq \delta, \bigcup_{i = 1}^{\infty} C_{i} \supseteq E \right\},$$

is not only an outer measure, but in fact a metric outer measure as well. (Some authors prefer to take a supremum over δ > 0 rather than a limit as δ → 0; the two give the same result, since μ_{δ}(E) increases as δ decreases.)

For the function τ one can use

$$\tau(C) = \operatorname{diam} (C)^s,\,$$

where s is a positive constant; this τ is defined on the power set of all subsets of X. By Carathéodory's extension theorem, the outer measure can be promoted to a full measure; the associated measure μ is the s-dimensional Hausdorff measure. More generally, one could use any so-called dimension function.

This construction is very important in fractal geometry, since this is how the Hausdorff measure is obtained. The packing measure is superficially similar, but is obtained in a different manner, by packing balls inside a set, rather than covering the set.

== Properties of metric outer measures ==
Let μ be a metric outer measure on a metric space (X, d).

- For any sequence of subsets A_{n}, n ∈ N, of X with

$$A_{1} \subseteq A_{2} \subseteq \dots \subseteq A = \bigcup_{n = 1}^{\infty} A_{n},$$

and such that A_{n} and A \ A_{n+1} are positively separated, it follows that

$$\mu (A) = \sup_{n \in \mathbb{N}} \mu (A_{n}).$$

- All the d-closed subsets E of X are μ-measurable in the sense that they satisfy the following version of Carathéodory's criterion: for all sets A and B with A ⊆ E and B ⊆ X \ E,

$$\mu (A \cup B) = \mu (A) + \mu (B).$$

- Consequently, all the Borel subsets of X — those obtainable as countable unions, intersections and set-theoretic differences of open/closed sets — are μ-measurable.
