= Sib, Sistan and Baluchestan =

City in Sistan and Baluchestan province, Iran

Sib Persian: سیب
- City
- Location within Iran
- Coordinates: 27°14′23″N 62°04′36″E
- Country: Iran
- Province: Sistan and Baluchestan
- County: Sib and Suran
- District: Central

Population (2016)
  - Total: 3,879
- Time zone: UTC+3:30 (IRST)

Sib (Persian: سیب) is a city in the Central District of Sib and Suran County, Sistan and Baluchestan province, Iran.

== Demographics ==
=== Population ===
At the time of the 2006 National Census, Sib's population was 2,612 in 513 households, when it was a village in Sib and Suran Rural District of the former Sib and Suran District of Saravan County. The following census in 2011 counted 3,976 people in 1,110 households, by which time the district had been separated from the county in the establishment of Sib and Suran County. The rural district was transferred to the new Central District. The 2016 census measured the population of the village as 3,879 people in 1,058 households. It was the most populous village in its rural district.

After the census, Sib was elevated to the status of a city.
