= Kuhak Rural District (Saravan County) =

Rural district in Sistan and Baluchestan province, Iran

Kuhak Rural District Persian: دهستان کوهک
- Rural District
- Location within Iran
- Coordinates: 27°03′43″N 63°06′02″E
- Country: Iran
- Province: Sistan and Baluchestan
- County: Saravan
- District: Mehregan
- Capital: Kuhak
- Time zone: UTC+3:30 (IRST)

Kuhak Rural District (Persian: دهستان کوهک) is in Mehregan District of Saravan County, Sistan and Baluchestan province, Iran. Its capital is the village of Kuhak, whose population at the time of the 2016 National Census was 3,201 people in 793 households.

== History ==
In 2017, Kuhak-e Esfandak Rural District (Note: Renamed Esfandak Rural District) was separated from Bam Pasht District in the formation of Mehregan District, and Kuhak Rural District was created in the new district.
