= Mohammadi, Sistan and Baluchestan, Iran =

Mohammadi محمدی
- City
- Location within Iran
- Coordinates: 27°19′40″N 62°23′24″E
- Country: Iran
- Province: Sistan and Baluchestan
- County: Saravan
- Bakhsh: Central

Population (2016 Census)
  - Total: 5,606
- Time zone: UTC+3:30 (IRST)
  - Summer (DST): UTC+4:30 (IRDT)

Mohammadi (Persian: محمدی), is a city in and the capital of Central District, in Saravan County, Sistan and Baluchestan Province, Iran. At the 2016 census, its population was 5,606, in 1,117 families.

== People ==
Most people in Mohammadi are Baloch and most people speak the Balochi language.
