= Dezak, Sistan and Baluchestan =

Village in Sistan and Baluchestan province, Iran

Dezak Persian: دزک
- Village
- Location within Iran
- Coordinates: 27°20′33″N 62°22′00″E
- Country: Iran
- Province: Sistan and Baluchestan
- County: Saravan
- District: Central
- Rural District: Howmeh

Population (2016)
  - Total: 7,566
- Time zone: UTC+3:30 (IRST)

Dezak (Persian: دزک) is a village in Howmeh Rural District of the Central District of Saravan County, Sistan and Baluchestan province, Iran.

== Demographics ==
=== Population ===
At the time of the 2006 National Census, the village's population was 5,268 in 906 households. The following census in 2011 counted 6,078 people in 1,192 households. The 2016 census measured the population of the village as 7,566 people in 1,999 households. It was the most populous village in its rural district.
