= Keshtegan =

Village in Sistan and Baluchestan province, Iran

Keshtegan Persian: کشتگان
- Village
- Location within Iran
- Coordinates: 26°38′49″N 63°01′18″E
- Country: Iran
- Province: Sistan and Baluchestan
- County: Saravan
- District: Bam Pasht
- Rural District: Keshtegan

Population (2016)
  - Total: 819
- Time zone: UTC+3:30 (IRST)

Keshtegan (Persian: کشتگان) is a village in, and the capital of, Keshtegan Rural District of Bam Pasht District, Saravan County, Sistan and Baluchestan province, Iran.

== Demographics ==
=== Population ===
At the time of the 2006 National Census, the village's population was 924 in 172 households. The following census in 2011 counted 998 people in 212 households. The 2016 census measured the population of the village as 819 people in 240 households.
