= Sukhteh Mok =

Village in Sistan and Baluchestan province, Iran

Sukhteh Mok Persian: سوخته مک
- Village
- Location within Iran
- Coordinates: 26°47′42″N 62°50′29″E
- Country: Iran
- Province: Sistan and Baluchestan
- County: Saravan
- District: Bam Pasht
- Rural District: Bam Pasht

Population (2016)
  - Total: 635
- Time zone: UTC+3:30 (IRST)

Sukhteh Mok (Persian: سوخته مک) is a village in Bam Pasht Rural District of Bam Pasht District, Saravan County, Sistan and Baluchestan province, Iran.

== Demographics ==
=== Population ===
At the time of the 2006 National Census, the village's population was 367 in 88 households. The following census in 2011 counted 425 people in 106 households. The 2016 census measured the population of the village as 635 people in 169 households. It was the most populous village in its rural district.
