= Content =

Content or contents may refer to:

== Media ==
- Content (media), information or experience provided to audience or end-users by publishers or media producers
  - Content industry, an umbrella term that encompasses companies owning and providing mass media and media metadata
  - Content provider, a provider of non-core services in the telecommunications industry
  - Free content, published material that can be used, copied, and modified without significant legal restriction
  - Open content, published material licensed to authorize copying and modification by anyone
  - Web content, information published on the World Wide Web
- Content analysis, a methodology used in the social sciences and humanities for studying the content of communication
- Content format, an encoded format for converting a specific type of data to displayable information
- Digital content, content that exists in the form of digital data
- Table of contents, a list of chapters or sections in a document

== Places ==
- Content (Centreville, Maryland) also known as C.C. Harper Farm, a historic home located at Centreville, Maryland
- Content (Upper Marlboro, Maryland) also known as the Bowling House, a historic home located in Upper Marlboro, Maryland
- Content, Pennsylvania, an unincorporated community
- Content, a village in Jamaica; see Sherwood Content

== People with the surname ==
- Charles Content (born 1987), Mauritian footballer
- Karina Content (born 1960), Dutch writer and politician
- Sylvain Content (born 1971), Mauritian footballer

== Arts and entertainment ==
=== Music ===
- Content (Gang of Four album), a 2011 studio album by Gang of Four
- Content (Joywave album), a 2017 studio album by Joywave
- "Content", a 2021 song by Bo Burnham from the special Bo Burnham: Inside

=== Periodicals ===
- Brill's Content, a former media watchdog publication by Steven Brill (journalist)

=== Television and web series ===
- Content (web series); an Australian ABC comedy web series starring Charlotte Nicdao and Gemma Bird Matheson

== Mathematics ==
- Content (measure theory), a concept in mathematics
- Primitive part and content, in mathematics, content is the greatest common divisor of the coefficients of a polynomial

== Ships ==
- HMS Content, ships of the British Royal Navy
- USS Content (SP-538), a United States Navy vessel

== Other uses ==
- Content (Freudian dream analysis), a dream as it is remembered and the hidden meaning of the dream in Freudian analysis
- Contents insurance, insurance that pays for damage to, or loss of, an individual's personal possessions whilst they are located within that individual's home

== See also ==
- Content security (disambiguation)
- Contentment, a state of being
