= Cont =

Cont may refer to:

- European Parliament Committee on Budgetary Control (CONT)
- Cont Mhlanga (1958–2022), Zimbabwean playwright
- Jacques Lu Cont (born 1977), British musician

== See also ==
- Content (disambiguation), where "cont" is a short form for several values
- Continent (disambiguation), where "cont" is a short form for several values
- Continue (disambiguation), where "cont" is a short form for several values
- Control (disambiguation), where "cont" is a short form for several values
- Kont (disambiguation)
