= Esfandak =

City in Sistan and Baluchestan province, Iran

Esfandak Persian: اسفندک
- City
- Location within Iran
- Coordinates: 27°06′45″N 62°50′09″E
- Country: Iran
- Province: Sistan and Baluchestan
- County: Saravan
- District: Mehregan

Population (2016)
  - Total: 2,962
- Time zone: UTC+3:30 (IRST)

Esfandak (Persian: اسفندک) is a city in, and the capital of, Mehregan District of Saravan County, Sistan and Baluchestan province, Iran. It also serves as the administrative center for Esfandak Rural District. (Note: Formerly Kuhak-e Esfandak Rural District)

== Demographics ==
=== Population ===
At the time of the 2006 National Census, Esfandak's population was 2,003 in 440 households, when it was a village in Kuhak-e Esfandak Rural District (Note: Renamed Esfandak Rural District) of Bam Pasht District. The following census in 2011 counted 2,387 people in 587 households. The village's population at the 2016 census was 2,962 people in 725 households.

In 2017, the rural district was separated from the district in the formation of Mehregan District In 2021, Esfandak was elevated to the status of a city, and renamed Esfandak Rural District.
