= Paskuh Rural District =

Paskuh Rural District (Persian: دهستان پسكوه) may refer to:

- Paskuh Rural District (Sib and Suran County), Sistan and Baluchestan province
- Paskuh Rural District (Qaen County), South Khorasan province

== See also ==
- Pasakuh Rural District
