= Sinokan Rural District =

Rural district in Sistan and Baluchestan province, Iran

Sinokan Rural District Persian: دهستان سینوکان
- Rural District
- Location within Iran
- Coordinates: 27°49′04″N 62°18′52″E
- Country: Iran
- Province: Sistan and Baluchestan
- County: Golshan
- District: Central
- Capital: Sinokan
- Time zone: UTC+3:30 (IRST)

Sinokan Rural District (Persian: دهستان سینوکان) is in the Central District (Note: Formerly Jaleq District of Saravan County) of Golshan County, Sistan and Baluchestan province, Iran. Its capital is the village of Sinokan, whose population at the time of the 2016 National Census was 1,033 people in 254 households.

== History ==
In 2019, Jaleq District (Note: Renamed the Central District of Golshan County) was separated from Saravan County in the establishment of Golshan County and renamed the Central District. Singan Rural District was created in the district.
