= Paskuh District =

District in Sistan and Baluchestan province, Iran

Paskuh District Persian: بخش پسکوه
- District
- Location within Iran
- Coordinates: 27°39′40″N 61°34′31″E
- Country: Iran
- Province: Sistan and Baluchestan
- County: Sib and Suran
- Capital: Paskuh
- Time zone: UTC+3:30 (IRST)

Paskuh District (Persian: بخش پسکوه) is in Sib and Suran County, Sistan and Baluchestan province, Iran. Its capital is the village of Paskuh, whose population at the time of the 2016 National Census was 4,048 people in 1,009 households.

== History ==
After the 2006 census, Hiduj and Sib and Suran Districts were separated from Saravan County in the establishment of Sib and Suran County, which was divided into two districts of two rural districts each, with the city of Suran as its capital.

After the 2016 census, Paskuh Rural District was separated from the Central District in the formation of Paskuh District.

== Demographics ==
=== Administrative divisions ===
Paskuh District
Administrative Divisions
Paskuh RD
Sar Sureh RD
RD = Rural District
