= Haqqabad, Saravan =

Village in Sistan and Baluchestan province, Iran

Haqqabad Persian: حق‌آباد
- Village
- Location within Iran
- Coordinates: 26°40′07″N 63°10′52″E
- Country: Iran
- Province: Sistan and Baluchestan
- County: Saravan
- District: Bam Pasht
- Rural District: Keshtegan

Population (2016)
  - Total: 1,570
- Time zone: UTC+3:30 (IRST)

Haqqabad (Persian: حق‌آباد) is a village in Keshtegan Rural District of Bam Pasht District, Saravan County, Sistan and Baluchestan province, Iran.

== Demographics ==
=== Population ===
At the time of the 2006 National Census, the village's population was 760 in 131 households. The following census in 2011 counted 1,113 people in 215 households. The 2016 census measured the population of the village as 1,570 people in 324 households. It was the most populous village in its rural district.
