= Gauge function =

In mathematics, gauge function may refer to

- the gauge as used in the definition of the Henstock-Kurzweil integral, also known as the gauge integral;
- in fractal geometry, a synonym for dimension function;
- in control theory and dynamical systems, a synonym for Lyapunov candidate function;
- in gauge theory, a synonym for gauge symmetry.
- a type of Minkowski functional
