= Hausdorff measure =

Generalization of volume to non-integer number of dimensions

In mathematics, Hausdorff measure is a generalization of the traditional notions of area and volume to non-integer dimensions, specifically fractals and their Hausdorff dimensions. It is a type of outer measure, named for Felix Hausdorff, that assigns a number in [0,∞] to each set in $\R^n$ or, more generally, in any metric space.

The zero-dimensional Hausdorff measure is the number of points in the set (if the set is finite) or ∞ if the set is infinite. Likewise, the one-dimensional Hausdorff measure of a simple curve in $\R^n$ is equal to the length of the curve, and the two-dimensional Hausdorff measure of a Lebesgue-measurable subset of $\R^2$ is proportional to the area of the set. Thus, the concept of the Hausdorff measure generalizes the Lebesgue measure and its notions of counting, length, and area. It also generalizes volume. In fact, there are d-dimensional Hausdorff measures for any d ≥ 0, which is not necessarily an integer. These measures are fundamental in geometric measure theory. They appear naturally in harmonic analysis or potential theory.

== Definition ==
Let $(X,\rho)$ be a metric space. For any subset $U\subset X$, let $\operatorname{diam}U$ denote its diameter, that is

$$\operatorname{diam}  U :=\sup\{\rho(x,y):x,y\in U\}, \quad \operatorname{diam} \emptyset:=0.$$

Let $S$ be any subset of $X,$ and let $\delta>0$ be a real number. Define

$$H^d_\delta(S)=\inf\left \{\sum_{i=1}^\infty (\operatorname{diam} U_i)^d: S \subseteq \bigcup_{i=1}^\infty U_i, \operatorname{diam} U_i<\delta\right \},$$

where the infimum is over all countable covers of $S$ by sets $U_i\subset X$ satisfying $\operatorname{diam} U_i<\delta$.

Note that $H^d_\delta(S)$ is monotone nonincreasing in $\delta$ since the larger $\delta$ is, the more collections of sets are permitted, making the infimum not larger. Thus, $\lim_{\delta\to 0}H^d_\delta(S)$ exists but may be infinite. Let

$$H^d(S):=\sup_{\delta>0} H^d_\delta(S)=\lim_{\delta\to 0}H^d_\delta(S).$$

It can be seen that $H^d(S)$ is an outer measure (more precisely, it is a metric outer measure). By Carathéodory's extension theorem, its restriction to the σ-field of Carathéodory-measurable sets is a measure. It is called the $d$-dimensional Hausdorff measure of $S$. Due to the metric outer measure property, all Borel subsets of $X$ are $H^d$ measurable.

In the above definition the sets in the covering are arbitrary. However, we can require the covering sets to be open or closed, or in normed spaces even convex, that will yield the same $H^d_\delta(S)$ numbers, hence the same measure. In $\R^n$ restricting the covering sets to be balls may change the measures but does not change the dimension of the measured sets.

== Properties of Hausdorff measures ==
Note that if d is a positive integer, the d-dimensional Hausdorff measure of $\R^d$ is a rescaling of the usual d-dimensional Lebesgue measure $\lambda_d$, which is normalized so that the Lebesgue measure of the unit cube [0,1]^{d} is 1. In fact, for any Borel set E,

$$\lambda_d(E) = 2^{-d} \alpha_d H^d(E),$$

where $2^{-d}$ scales diameter to radius; while $\alpha_d$ is the volume of the unit d-ball with radius one, which can be expressed using Euler's gamma function

$$\alpha_d =\frac{\Gamma\left(\frac12\right)^d}{\Gamma\left(\frac{d}{2}+1\right)} =\frac{\pi^{d/2}}{\Gamma\left(\frac{d}{2}+1\right)}.$$

This is

$$\lambda_d(E) = \beta_d H^d(E)$$,

where $\beta_d=2^{-d} \alpha_d$ is the volume of the d-ball with diameter one.

=== Scaled Hausdorff measure ===
Some authors (e.g. Evans & Gariepy (2015), chapters 2,3) adopt a definition of Hausdorff measure slightly different from the one chosen here, the difference being that the value $H^d(E)$ defined above is multiplied by the factor $\beta_d$, so that the scaled Hausdorff d-dimensional measure coincides exactly with Lebesgue measure in the case of Euclidean space. In this article we adopt the notation for scaled Hausdorff measure:

$$\bar H^d(E)=\beta_d H^d(E)$$

Further examples of the agreement of this scaled measure with Lebesgue measure include:

- For $B^d_r$, the d-ball with radius $r$ the agreement is direct. The volume is: $\bar H^d(B^d_r)=\lambda_d(B^d_r)=\alpha_dr^d.$
- For $S^{d-1}_r$, the (d-1)-sphere (surface of $B^d_r$) the agreement is more indirect. The area is: $\bar H^{d-1}(S^{d-1}_r)=\frac{d}{dr}\lambda_d(B^d_r)=d\alpha_dr^{d-1}.$ Note however that $\lambda_d(S^{d-1}_r)=0$, while $\lambda_{d-1}(S^{d-1}_r)$ is not defined.
- More generally, for a positive integer $m<d$, let $\mathcal M^m$ be a smooth m-dimensional manifold embedded in $\R^d$. For a measureable subset, $E\subseteq\mathcal M^m$, Lebesgue measure is not directly applicable, because $\lambda_d(E)=0$, while $\lambda_m(E)$ is not defined. But (informally stated), if we make $E$ small enough, so that it is indistinguishable from a subset in the local tangent space, which is an m-dimensional linear subspace of $\R^d$, we can apply $\lambda_m$ in the tangent space, where it will closely approximate $\bar H^m(E)$. An example is where local area on Earth's surface can be approximated by applying $\lambda_2$ to a locally isometric chart.

== Relation with Hausdorff dimension ==
It turns out that $H^d(S)$ may have a finite, nonzero value for at most one $d$. That is, the Hausdorff measure is zero for any value above a certain dimension and infinity below a certain dimension, analogous to the idea that the area of a line is zero and the length of a 2D shape is in some sense infinity. This leads to one of several possible equivalent definitions of the Hausdorff dimension:

$$\dim_{\mathrm{Haus}}(S)=\inf\{d\ge 0:H^d(S)=0\}=\sup\{d\ge 0:H^d(S)=\infty\},$$

where we take $\inf\emptyset=+\infty$ and $\sup\emptyset=0$.

Note that it is not guaranteed that the Hausdorff measure must be finite and nonzero for some d, and indeed the measure at the Hausdorff dimension may still be zero; in this case, the Hausdorff dimension still acts as a change point between measures of zero and infinity.

== Generalizations ==
In geometric measure theory and related fields, the Minkowski content is often used to measure the size of a subset of a metric measure space. For suitable domains in Euclidean space, the two notions of size coincide, up to overall normalizations depending on conventions. More precisely, a subset of $\R^n$ is said to be $m$-rectifiable if it is the image of a bounded set in $\R^m$ under a Lipschitz function. If $m<n$, then the $m$-dimensional Minkowski content of a closed $m$-rectifiable subset of $\R^n$ is equal to $2^{-m}\alpha_m$ times the $m$-dimensional Hausdorff measure (Federer 1969, Theorem 3.2.39, pp 275).

In fractal geometry, some fractals with Hausdorff dimension $d$ have zero or infinite $d$-dimensional Hausdorff measure. For example, almost surely the image of planar Brownian motion has Hausdorff dimension 2 and its two-dimensional Hausdorff measure is zero. In order to "measure" the "size" of such sets, the following variation on the notion of the Hausdorff measure can be considered:

In the definition of the measure $(\operatorname{diam}U_i)^d$ is replaced with $\phi(\operatorname{diam}U_i),$ where $\phi$ is any monotone increasing function satisfying $\phi(0)=0.$

This is the Hausdorff measure of $S$ with gauge function $\phi,$ or $\phi$-Hausdorff measure. A $d$-dimensional set $S$ may satisfy $H^d(S)=0,$ but $H^\phi(S)\in (0,\infty)$ with an appropriate $\phi.$ Examples of gauge functions include

$$\phi(t)=t^2 \log\log\frac{1}{t} \quad \text{or} \quad \phi(t) = t^2\log\frac{1}{t}\log\log\log\frac{1}{t}.$$

The former gives almost surely positive and $\sigma$-finite measure to the Brownian path in $\R^n$ when $n>2$, and the latter when $n=2$.

== See also ==
- Minkowski content
- Measure theory
