= Hiduj Rural District =

Rural district in Sistan and Baluchestan province, Iran

Hiduj Rural District Persian: دهستان هیدوچ
- Rural District
- Location within Iran
- Coordinates: 26°51′04″N 62°17′13″E
- Country: Iran
- Province: Sistan and Baluchestan
- County: Sib and Suran
- District: Hiduj
- Capital: Hiduj

Population (2016)
  - Total: 8,779
- Time zone: UTC+3:30 (IRST)

Hiduj Rural District (Persian: دهستان هیدوچ) is in Hiduj District of Sib and Suran County, Sistan and Baluchestan province, Iran. It is administered from the city of Hiduj.

== Demographics ==
=== Population ===
At the time of the 2006 National Census, the rural district's population (as a part of Saravan County) was 6,454 in 1,542 households. There were 7,443 inhabitants in 2,007 households at the following census of 2011, by which time the district had been separated from the county in the establishment of Sib and Suran County. The 2016 census measured the population of the rural district as 8,779 in 2,377 households. The most populous of its 36 villages was Kershan-e Pain, with 1,654 people.
