= Howmeh Rural District (Saravan County) =

Rural district in Sistan and Baluchestan province, Iran

Howmeh Rural District Persian: دهستان حومه
- Rural District
- Location within Iran
- Coordinates: 27°20′10″N 62°22′58″E
- Country: Iran
- Province: Sistan and Baluchestan
- County: Saravan
- District: Central
- Capital: Mohammadi

Population (2016)
  - Total: 41,735
- Time zone: UTC+3:30 (IRST)

Howmeh Rural District (Persian: دهستان حومه) is in the Central District of Saravan County, Sistan and Baluchestan province, Iran. It is administered from the city of Mohammadi.

== Demographics ==
=== Population ===
At the time of the 2006 National Census, the rural district's population was 31,815 in 6,042 households. There were 40,490 inhabitants in 9,103 households at the following census of 2011. The 2016 census measured the population of the rural district as 41,735 in 10,704 households. The most populous of its 102 villages was Dezak, with 7,566 people.
