= Kalleh Gan District =

District in Sistan and Baluchestan province, Iran

Kalleh Gan District Persian: بخش کله‌گان
- District
- Location within Iran
- Coordinates: 27°25′09″N 62°40′09″E
- Country: Iran
- Province: Sistan and Baluchestan
- County: Golshan
- Capital: Band
- Time zone: UTC+3:30 (IRST)

Kalleh Gan District (Persian: بخش کله‌گان) is in Golshan County, Sistan and Baluchestan province, Iran. Its capital is the village of Band, whose population at the time of the 2016 National Census was 1,316 in 346 households.

== History ==
In 2019, Jaleq District (Note: Renamed the Central District of Golshan County) was separated from Saravan County in the establishment of Golshan County and renamed the Central District. The new county was divided into two districts of two rural districts each, with Jaleq as its capital and only city.

== Demographics ==
=== Administrative divisions ===
Kalleh Gan District
Administrative Divisions
Kalleh Gan RD
Shand Ashkandan RD
RD = Rural District
