= Rich Hill, Ohio =

Unincorporated community in Ohio, U.S.

Coordinates: 40°19′16″N 82°43′38″W

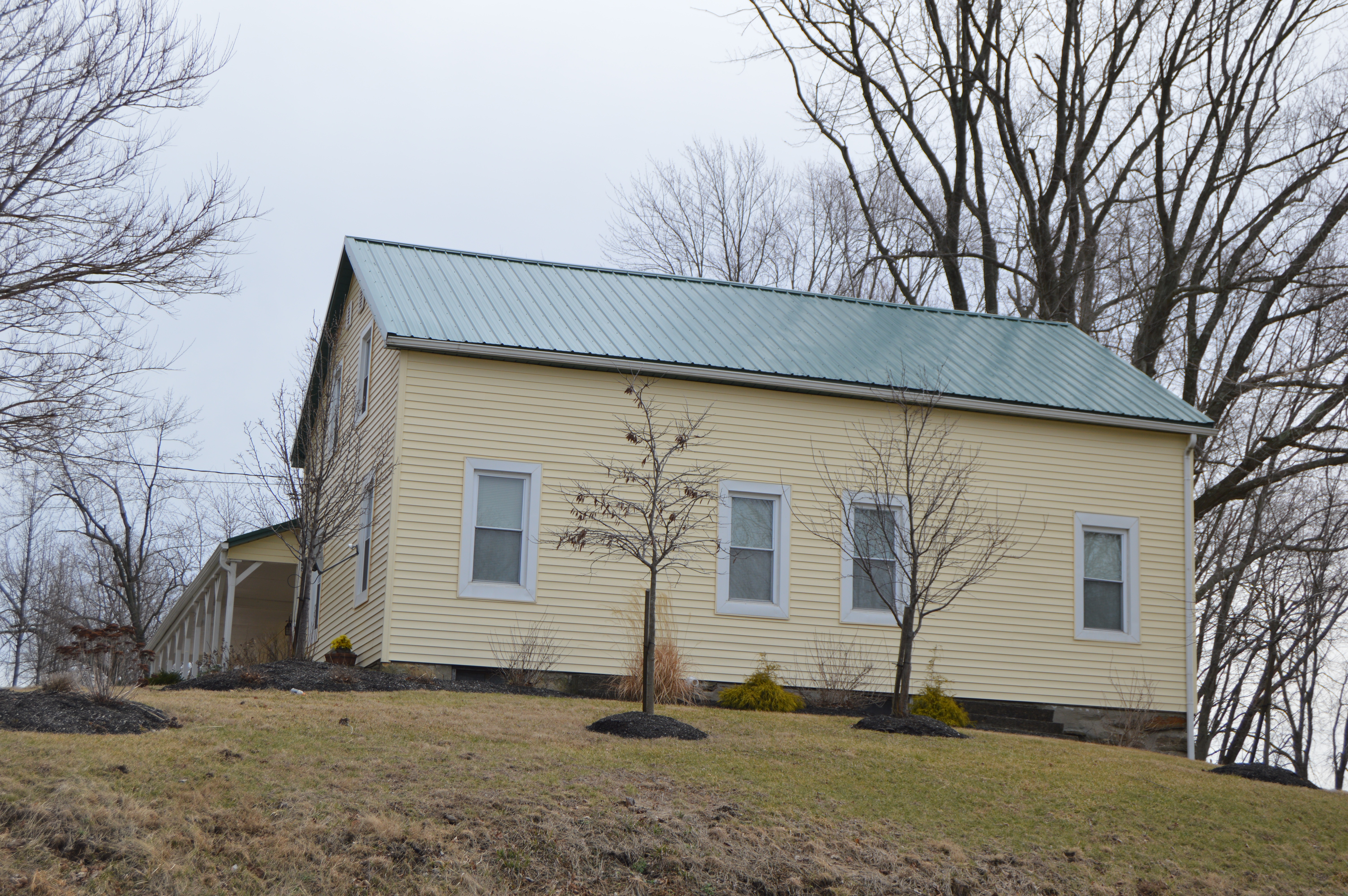
Older house on Updike Road

Rich Hill is an unincorporated community in Knox County, in the U.S. state of Ohio.

== History ==
Rich Hill was originally called Hilliar, and under the latter name was laid out in 1852 when the railroad was extended to that point. The community took its name from nearby Rich Hill. A post office called Rich Hill was established in 1870 and remained in operation until 1927.
