= Saravan, Iran =

City in Sistan and Baluchestan province, Iran

Saravan Persian: سراوان
- City
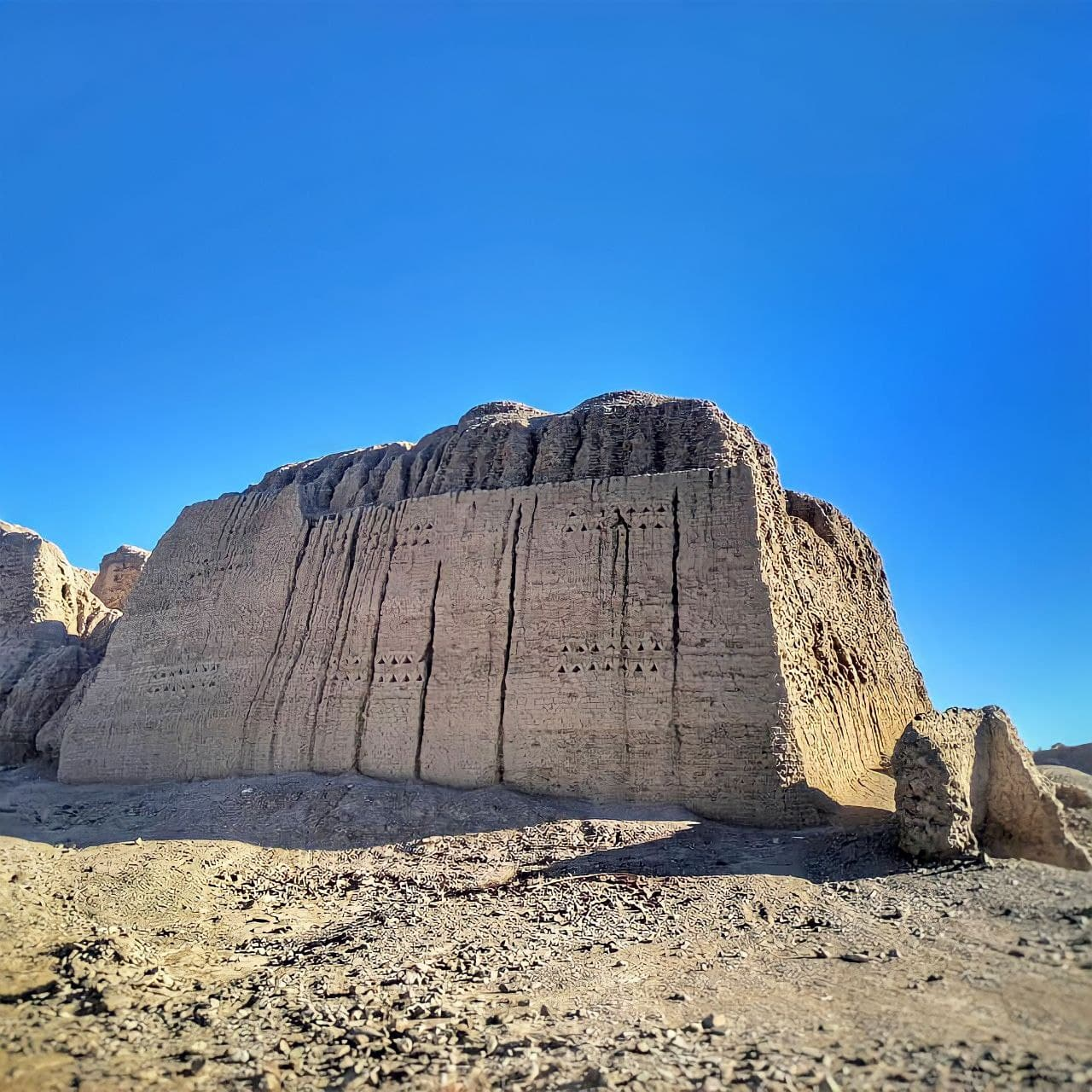

- Location within Iran
- Coordinates: 27°22′15″N 62°19′57″E
- Country: Iran
- Province: Sistan and Baluchestan
- County: Saravan
- District: Central

Population (2016)
  - Total: 60,014
- Time zone: UTC+3:30 (IRST)

Saravan (Balochi and ) (Note: Also romanized as Sarāvān and Sarāwān; formerly Shastoon) is a city in the Central District of Saravan County, Sistan and Baluchestan province, Iran, serving as capital of both the county and the district. The city lies in a long valley in the south of Masheked and north of Makran, close to the international border with Pakistan.

== Demographics ==
=== Language and ethnicity ===
The inhabitants of the city are Baloch and speak the Balochi language.

=== Population ===
At the time of the 2006 National Census, the city's population was 58,652 in 10,078 households. The following census in 2011 counted 59,795 people in 13,257 households. The 2016 census measured the population of the city as 60,014 people in 15,929 households.

== Earthquake ==
In 2013, a major earthquake with a magnitude of 7.8 occurred near the city.

== Attacks on public figures ==
Saravan has been the location of many attacks, presumably by Baloch insurgents.

- In 2008, Judge Ebrahim Karimi was assassinated.
- A suicide bombing in 2008 killed four people.
- On 26 October 2013, about 20 Iranian border guards were killed in an attack by Baloch rebels near the Pakistani border.
- In January 2024, Pakistan launched airstrikes in Saravan in Operation Marg Bar Sarmachar, in a retaliation for Iranian airstrikes on Pakistan two days earlier.
- On 27 January 2024, a terrorist attack on Pakistani nationals killed nine people.

== Climate ==
Saravan has a hot desert climate (Köppen: BWh), with very hot summers, mild winters, and ample sunshine throughout the year.

Climate data for Saravan, Iran (1991–2020)
Month	Jan	Feb	Mar	Apr	May	Jun	Jul	Aug	Sep	Oct	Nov	Dec	Year
Record high °C (°F)	27.1 (80.8)	32.3 (90.1)	35.8 (96.4)	40.3 (104.5)	43.4 (110.1)	45.4 (113.7)	44.6 (112.3)	44.4 (111.9)	41.4 (106.5)	37.6 (99.7)	34.2 (93.6)	29.4 (84.9)	45.4 (113.7)
Mean daily maximum °C (°F)	17.7 (63.9)	20.6 (69.1)	25.1 (77.2)	31.2 (88.2)	36.1 (97.0)	39.0 (102.2)	39.7 (103.5)	38.4 (101.1)	35.3 (95.5)	30.4 (86.7)	24.2 (75.6)	19.7 (67.5)	29.8 (85.6)
Daily mean °C (°F)	10.8 (51.4)	13.6 (56.5)	18.3 (64.9)	24.3 (75.7)	29.3 (84.7)	32.3 (90.1)	32.8 (91.0)	31.4 (88.5)	27.9 (82.2)	22.9 (73.2)	16.6 (61.9)	12.1 (53.8)	22.7 (72.9)
Mean daily minimum °C (°F)	3.9 (39.0)	6.6 (43.9)	11.0 (51.8)	16.2 (61.2)	21.0 (69.8)	24.2 (75.6)	25.5 (77.9)	23.5 (74.3)	19.1 (66.4)	14.3 (57.7)	8.6 (47.5)	4.6 (40.3)	14.9 (58.8)
Record low °C (°F)	−6.0 (21.2)	−4.3 (24.3)	−0.2 (31.6)	4.0 (39.2)	10.4 (50.7)	16.6 (61.9)	18.8 (65.8)	17.0 (62.6)	10.0 (50.0)	3.6 (38.5)	−3.6 (25.5)	−6.0 (21.2)	−6.0 (21.2)
Average precipitation mm (inches)	19.1 (0.75)	14.9 (0.59)	22.1 (0.87)	6.4 (0.25)	6.1 (0.24)	5.9 (0.23)	5.5 (0.22)	4.8 (0.19)	0.9 (0.04)	4.6 (0.18)	4.5 (0.18)	10.0 (0.39)	104.8 (4.13)
Average precipitation days (≥ 1.0 mm)	2.1	1.9	2.9	0.9	1.1	0.6	0.7	0.3	0.2	0.6	0.7	1.1	13.1
Average relative humidity (%)	42.0	39.0	34.0	24.0	20.0	19.0	25.0	22.0	18.0	22.0	29.0	36.0	27.5
Average dew point °C (°F)	−3.5 (25.7)	−2.3 (27.9)	−0.5 (31.1)	0.3 (32.5)	1.6 (34.9)	2.5 (36.5)	6.6 (43.9)	3.5 (38.3)	−1.2 (29.8)	−2.2 (28.0)	−3.3 (26.1)	−4.9 (23.2)	−0.3 (31.5)
Mean monthly sunshine hours	255	242	262	290	317	322	307	318	309	303	279	266	3,470
Source 1: NOAA
Source 2: Ogimet (April record high)
