= Bam Pasht Rural District =

Rural district in Sistan and Baluchestan province, Iran

Bam Pasht Rural District Persian: دهستان بم پشت
- Rural District
- Location within Iran
- Coordinates: 26°51′48″N 62°41′17″E
- Country: Iran
- Province: Sistan and Baluchestan
- County: Saravan
- District: Bam Pasht
- Capital: Sirkan

Population (2016)
  - Total: 14,481
- Time zone: UTC+3:30 (IRST)

Bam Pasht Rural District (Persian: دهستان بم پشت) is in Bam Pasht District of Saravan County, Sistan and Baluchestan province, Iran. It is administered from the city of Sirkan.

== Demographics ==
=== Population ===
At the time of the 2006 National Census, the rural district's population was 11,029 in 2,737 households. There were 12,510 inhabitants in 3,142 households at the following census of 2011. The 2016 census measured the population of the rural district as 14,481 in 4,165 households. The most populous of its 90 villages was Sukhteh Mok, with 635 people.
