= Gosht Rural District (Saravan County) =

Rural district in Sistan and Baluchestan province, Iran

Gosht Rural District Persian: دهستان گشت
- Rural District
- Location within Iran
- Coordinates: 27°48′40″N 61°53′30″E
- Country: Iran
- Province: Sistan and Baluchestan
- County: Saravan
- District: Central
- Capital: Gosht

Population (2016)
  - Total: 4,655
- Time zone: UTC+3:30 (IRST)

Gosht Rural District (Persian: دهستان گشت) is in the Central District of Saravan County, Sistan and Baluchestan, Iran. It is administered from the city of Gosht.

== Demographics ==
=== Population ===
At the time of the 2006 National Census, the population of Gosht Rural District was 6,588, in 1,429 households. The following census of 2011 counted 3,476 inhabitants in 843 households. The 2016 census measured the population as 4,655 in 1,206 households. Of its 105 villages, Gidbast was the most populous, with 441 people.
