= Jaleq Rural District =

Rural district in Sistan and Baluchestan province, Iran

Jaleq Rural District Persian: دهستان جالق
- Rural District
- Location within Iran
- Coordinates: 27°47′N 62°36′E
- Country: Iran
- Province: Sistan and Baluchestan
- County: Golshan
- District: Central
- Capital: Khvoshab

Population (2016)
  - Total: 2,877
- Time zone: UTC+3:30 (IRST)

Jaleq Rural District (Persian: دهستان جالق) is in the Central District (Note: Formerly Jaleq District of Saravan County) of Golshan County, Sistan and Baluchestan province, Iran. Its capital is the village of Khvoshab.

== Demographics ==
=== Population ===
At the time of the 2006 National Census, the rural district's population (as a part of Jaleq District (Note: Renamed the Central District of Golshan County) of Saravan County) was 1,278 in 334 households. There were 1,123 inhabitants in 282 households at the following census of 2011. The 2016 census measured the population of the rural district as 2,877 in 803 households. The most populous of its 24 villages was Naranu, with 718 people.

In 2019, the district was separated from the county in the establishment of Golshan County and renamed the Central District.
