= Hiduj =

City in Sistan and Baluchestan province, Iran

Hiduj Persian: هيدوچ
- City
- Location within Iran
- Coordinates: 27°00′02″N 62°07′01″E
- Country: Iran
- Province: Sistan and Baluchestan
- County: Sib and Suran
- District: Hiduj

Population (2016)
  - Total: 1,674
- Time zone: UTC+3:30 (IRST)

Hiduj (Persian: هيدوچ) (Note: Also romanized as Hīdūj; also known as Hīdach, Hiduch, Hīdūj-e Bālā (هیدوج بالا; English: Upper Hiduj), Hindugeh, and Īdoj-e Bālā) is a city in, and the capital of, Hiduj District of Sib and Suran County, Sistan and Baluchestan province, Iran. It also serves as the administrative center for Hiduj Rural District.

== Demographics ==
=== Population ===
At the time of the 2006 National Census, the city's population was 1,065 in 217 households, when it was in Saravan County. The following census in 2011 counted 1,526 people in 358 households, by which time the district had been separated from its parent county during the establishment of Sib and Suran County. At the 2016 census, the population of the city was 1,674 in 383 households.
