= Mohammadi, Sistan and Baluchestan =

City in Sistan and Baluchestan province, Iran

Mohammadi Persian: محمدی
- City
- Location within Iran
- Coordinates: 27°20′04″N 62°23′19″E
- Country: Iran
- Province: Sistan and Baluchestan
- County: Saravan
- District: Central

Population (2016)
  - Total: 5,606
- Time zone: UTC+3:30 (IRST)

Mohammadi (Persian: محمدی) is a city in the Central District of Saravan County, Sistan and Baluchestan province, Iran, serving as the administrative center for Howmeh Rural District.

== Demographics ==
=== Population ===
At the time of the 2006 National Census, Mohammadi's population was 4,256 in 761 households, when it was a village in Howmeh Rural District. The following census in 2011 counted 5,206 people in 1,117 households, by which time the village had been elevated to the status of a city. The 2016 census measured the population of the city as 5,606 people in 1,642 households.
