= Sirkan =

City in Sistan and Baluchestan province, Iran

Sirkan Persian: سيركان
- City
- Location within Iran
- Coordinates: 26°49′41″N 62°38′30″E
- Country: Iran
- Province: Sistan and Baluchestan
- County: Saravan
- District: Bam Pasht

Population (2016)
  - Total: 2,196
- Time zone: UTC+3:30 (IRST)

Sirkan (Persian: سيركان) (Note: Also romanized as Sīrkān) is a city in and the capital of Bam Pasht District, in the Saravan County of the Sistan and Baluchestan province of southeastern Iran. It also serves as the administrative center for Bam Pasht Rural District. Its population is 2,196 and its timezone is UTC+3:30 (IRST).

== Demographics ==
=== Population ===
At the time of the 2006 National Census, the city's population was 1,347 in 284 households. The following census in 2011 counted 1,499 people in 349 households. The 2016 census measured the population of the city as 2,196 people in 557 households.

== Overview ==
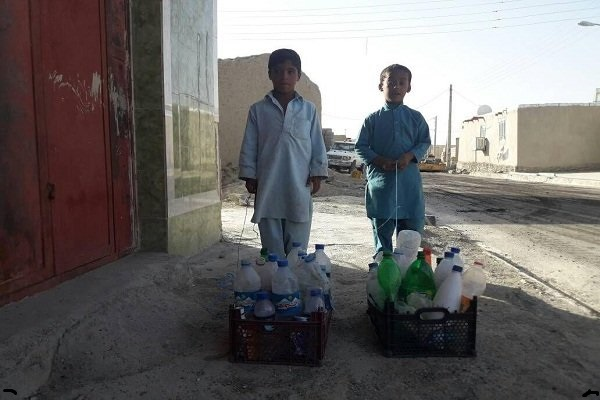
The population in Sirkan does not have access to freshwater.

People in Sirkan have struggled with access to drinking water since a dam dried up in October 2015.

== Education ==
Sirkan is regarded as one of the most underdeveloped regions in Iran, but the students have shown unexpected performance in the Iranian University Entrance Exam.

Primary schools:

- Meysam School
- Khadijah Kobra School
