= Gosht, Iran =

City in Sistan and Baluchestan province, Iran

Gosht Persian: گشت
- City
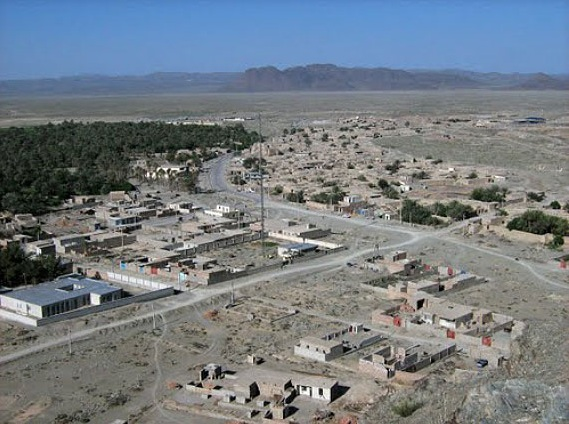

- Location within Iran
- Coordinates: 27°47′20″N 61°57′05″E
- Country: Iran
- Province: Sistan and Baluchestan
- County: Saravan
- District: Central

Population (2016)
  - Total: 4,992
- Time zone: UTC+3:30 (IRST)

Gosht (Persian: گشت is a city in the Central District of Saravan County, Sistan and Baluchestan province, Iran, serving as the administrative center for Gosht Rural District.

== Demographics ==
=== Language and ethnicity ===
Most people in Gosht are Baloch and most people speak the Balochi language.

=== Population ===
At the time of the 2006 National Census, Gosht's population was 3,863 in 830 households, when it was a village in Gosht Rural District. The following census in 2011 counted 5,145 people in 1,134 households, by which time the village had been elevated to the status of a city. The 2016 census measured the population of the city as 4,992 people in 1,229 households.
