= Nahuk Rural District =

Rural district in Sistan and Baluchestan province, Iran

Nahuk Rural District Persian: دهستان ناهوک
- Rural District
- Location within Iran
- Coordinates: 27°38′05″N 62°18′18″E
- Country: Iran
- Province: Sistan and Baluchestan
- County: Saravan
- District: Central
- Capital: Kushkuk-e Nahuk

Population (2016)
  - Total: 8,414
- Time zone: UTC+3:30 (IRST)

Nahuk Rural District (Persian: دهستان ناهوک) is in the Central District of Saravan County, Sistan and Baluchestan province, Iran. Its capital is the village of Kushkuk-e Nahuk.

== Demographics ==
=== Population ===
At the time of the 2006 National Census, the rural district's population (as a part of Jaleq District (Note: Renamed the Central District of Golshan County)) was 5,097 in 961 households. There were 6,038 inhabitants in 1,403 households at the following census of 2011. The 2016 census measured the population of the rural district as 8,414 in 2,239 households. The most populous of its 44 villages was Kupak, with 1,477 people.

The rural district was transferred to the Central District in 2019.
