= Surface area =

Measure of a two-dimensional surface

A sphere of radius r has surface area 4πr^{2}.

The surface area (symbol A) of a solid object is a measure of the total area that the surface of the object occupies. The mathematical definition of surface area in the presence of curved surfaces is considerably more involved than the definition of arc length of one-dimensional curves, or of the surface area for polyhedra (i.e., objects with flat polygonal faces), for which the surface area is the sum of the areas of its faces. Smooth surfaces, such as a sphere, are assigned surface area using their representation as parametric surfaces. This definition of surface area is based on methods of infinitesimal calculus and involves partial derivatives and double integration.

A general definition of surface area was sought by Henri Lebesgue and Hermann Minkowski at the turn of the twentieth century. Their work led to the development of geometric measure theory, which studies various notions of surface area for irregular objects of any dimension. An important example is the Minkowski content of a surface.

== Definition ==
While the areas of many simple surfaces have been known since antiquity, a rigorous mathematical definition of area requires a great deal of care. This should provide a function
$$S \mapsto A(S)$$
which assigns a positive real number to a certain class of surfaces that satisfies several natural requirements. The most fundamental property of the surface area is its additivity: "the area of the whole is the sum of the areas of the parts". More rigorously, if a surface S is a union of finitely many pieces S_{1}, ..., S_{r} which do not overlap except at their boundaries, then
$$A(S) = A(S_1) + \cdots + A(S_r).$$

Surface areas of flat polygonal shapes must agree with their geometrically defined area. Since surface area is a geometric notion, areas of congruent surfaces must be the same and the area must depend only on the shape of the surface, but not on its position and orientation in space. This means that surface area is invariant under the group of Euclidean motions. These properties uniquely characterize surface area for a wide class of geometric surfaces called piecewise smooth. Such surfaces consist of finitely many pieces that can be represented in the parametric form
$$S_D: \vec{r}=\vec{r}(u,v), \quad (u,v)\in D$$
with a continuously differentiable function $\vec{r}.$ The area of an individual piece is defined by the formula
$$A(S_D) = \iint_D\left |\vec{r}_u\times\vec{r}_v\right | \, du \, dv.$$
Thus the area of S_{D} is obtained by integrating the length of the normal vector $\vec{r}_u\times\vec{r}_v$ to the surface over the appropriate region D in the parametric uv plane. The area of the whole surface is then obtained by adding together the areas of the pieces, using additivity of surface area. The main formula can be specialized to different classes of surfaces, giving, in particular, formulas for areas of graphs z = f(x,y) and surfaces of revolution.

Schwarz lantern with $M$ axial slices and $N$ radial vertices. The limit of the area as $M$ and $N$ tend to infinity doesn't converge. In particular it doesn't converge to the area of the cylinder.

One of the subtleties of surface area, as compared to arc length of curves, is that surface area cannot be defined simply as the limit of areas of polyhedral shapes approximating a given smooth surface. It was demonstrated by Hermann Schwarz that already for the cylinder, different choices of approximating flat surfaces can lead to different limiting values of the area; this example is known as the Schwarz lantern.

Various approaches to a general definition of surface area were developed in the late nineteenth and the early twentieth century by Henri Lebesgue and Hermann Minkowski. While for piecewise smooth surfaces there is a unique natural notion of surface area, if a surface is very irregular, or rough, then it may not be possible to assign an area to it at all. A typical example is given by a surface with spikes spread throughout in a dense fashion. Many surfaces of this type occur in the study of fractals. Extensions of the notion of area which partially fulfill its function and may be defined even for very badly irregular surfaces are studied in geometric measure theory. A specific example of such an extension is the Minkowski content of the surface.

== Common formulas ==
Surface areas of common solids
Shape	Formula/Equation	Variables
Cube	$6a^2$	a = side length
Cuboid	$2\left(lb+lh+bh\right)$	l = length; b = breadth; h = height
Triangular prism	$bh+l\left(p+q+r\right)$	b = base length of triangle, h = height of triangle, l = distance between triangular bases, p, q, r = sides of triangle
All prisms	$2B+Ph$	B = the area of one base; P = the perimeter of one base; h = height
Sphere	$4\pi r^2=\pi d^2$	r = radius of sphere; d = diameter
Hemisphere	$3\pi r^2$	r = radius of the hemisphere
Hemispherical shell	$\pi \left(3R^2+r^2\right)$	R = external radius of hemisphere; r = internal radius of hemisphere
Spherical lune	$2r^2\theta$	r = radius of sphere; θ = dihedral angle
Torus	$\left(2\pi r\right)\left(2\pi R\right)=4\pi^2Rr$	r = minor radius (radius of the tube); R = major radius (distance from center of tube to center of torus)
Closed cylinder	$2\pi r^2+2\pi rh=2\pi r\left(r+h\right)$	r = radius of the circular base; h = height of the cylinder
Cylindrical annulus	$$\begin{align} & 2\pi Rh + 2\pi rh + 2\left(\pi R^2 - \pi r^2\right) \\ &= 2\pi \left(R+r\right)\left(R-r+h\right) \end{align}$$	R = External radius; r = Internal radius; h = height
Capsule	$2\pi r(2r+h)$	r = radius of the hemispheres and cylinder; h = height of the cylinder
Curved surface area of a cone	$\pi r\sqrt{r^2+h^2}=\pi rs$	$s=\sqrt{r^2+h^2}$; s = slant height of the cone; r = radius of the circular base; h = height of the cone
Full surface area of a cone	$\pi r\left(r+\sqrt{r^2+h^2}\right)=\pi r\left(r +s\right)$	s = slant height of the cone; r = radius of the circular base; h = height of the cone
Regular Pyramid	$B+\frac{Ps}{2}$	B = area of base; P = perimeter of base; s = slant height
Square pyramid	$b^2 + 2bs = b^2+ 2b\sqrt{\left(\frac{b}{2}\right)^2+h^2}$	b = base length; s = slant height; h = vertical height
Rectangular pyramid	$lb+l\sqrt{\left(\frac{b}{2}\right)^2+h^2}+ b\sqrt{\left(\frac{l}{2}\right)^2+h^2}$	l = length; b = breadth; h = height
Tetrahedron	$\sqrt{3}a^2$	a = side length
Surface of revolution	$2\pi \int_a^b {f(x) \sqrt{1+(f'(x))^2} dx}$	
Parametric surface	$\iint_D \left \vert \vec{r}_u \times \vec{r}_v \right \vert dA$	$\vec{r}$ = parametric vector equation of surface; $\vec{r}_u$ = partial derivative of $\vec{r}$ with respect to $u$; $\vec{r}_v$ = partial derivative of $\vec{r}$ with respect to $v$; $D$ = shadow region

=== Ratio of surface areas of a sphere and cylinder of the same radius and height ===
A cone, sphere and cylinder of radius r and height h.

The below given formulas can be used to show that the surface area of a sphere and cylinder of the same radius and height are in the ratio 2 : 3, as follows.

Let the radius be r and the height be h (which is 2r for the sphere).

$$\begin{array}{rlll}
\text{Sphere surface area}   & = 4 \pi r^2      &                    & = (2 \pi r^2) \times 2 \\
\text{Cylinder surface area} & = 2 \pi r (h + r) & = 2 \pi r (2r + r) & = (2 \pi r^2) \times 3
\end{array}$$

The discovery of this ratio is credited to Archimedes.

== Applications ==
=== In chemistry ===
Surface area of particles of different sizes.

Surface area is important in chemical kinetics. Increasing the surface area of a substance generally increases the rate of a chemical reaction. For example, iron in a fine powder will combust, while in solid blocks it is stable enough to use in structures. For different applications a minimal or maximal surface area may be desired.

=== In biology ===
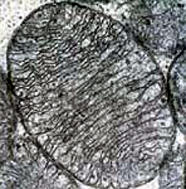
The inner membrane of the mitochondrion has a large surface area due to infoldings, allowing higher rates of cellular respiration (electron micrograph).

The surface area of an organism is important in several considerations, such as regulation of body temperature and digestion. Animals use their teeth to grind food down into smaller particles, increasing the surface area available for digestion. The epithelial tissue lining the digestive tract contains microvilli, greatly increasing the area available for absorption. Elephants have large ears, allowing them to regulate their own body temperature. In other instances, animals will need to minimize surface area; for example, people will fold their arms over their chest when cold to minimize heat loss.

The surface area to volume ratio (SA:V) of a cell imposes upper limits on size, as the volume increases much faster than does the surface area, thus limiting the rate at which substances diffuse from the interior across the cell membrane to interstitial spaces or to other cells. Indeed, representing a cell as an idealized sphere of radius r, the volume and surface area are, respectively, V = (4/3)πr^{3} and SA = 4πr^{2}. The resulting surface area to volume ratio is therefore 3/r. Thus, if a cell has a radius of 1 μm, the SA:V ratio is 3; whereas if the radius of the cell is instead 10 μm, then the SA:V ratio becomes 0.3. With a cell radius of 100, SA:V ratio is 0.03. Thus, the surface area falls off steeply with increasing volume.

=== In geography ===
The area of a region on Earth's surface (e.g., "largest" countries) is normally calculated as the area bounded by a plane figure defined via a map projection, specifically an equal-area projection. The geographic area may also be calculated directly for its enclosing geodesic polygon on a reference ellipsoid. Approximations are possible for very large and very small regions, based on a spherical polygon or a local tangent plane, respectively. The elevation of the terrain (as represented by a digital terrain model) is typically neglected in geographic surface area calculations.

== See also ==
- Perimeter length
- Projected area
- BET theory, technique for the measurement of the specific surface area of materials
- Spherical area
- Surface integral
