= Content (measure theory) =

Generalization of a measure

In mathematics, in particular in measure theory, a content $\mu$ is a real-valued function defined on a collection of subsets $\mathcal{A}$ such that

1. $\mu(A)\in\ [0, \infty] \text{ whenever } A \in \mathcal{A}.$
2. $\mu(\varnothing) = 0.$
3. $\mu\Bigl(\bigcup_{i=1}^n A_i\Bigr) = \sum_{i=1}^n \mu(A_i) \text{ whenever } A_1, \dots, A_n, \bigcup_{i=1}^n A_i \in \mathcal{A} \text{ and } A_i \cap A_j = \varnothing \text{ for } i \neq j.$

That is, a content is a generalization of a measure: while the latter must be countably additive, the former must only be finitely additive.

In many important applications the $\mathcal{A}$ is chosen to be a ring of sets or to be at least a semiring of sets in which case some additional properties can be deduced which are described below. For this reason some authors prefer to define contents only for the case of semirings or even rings.

If a content is additionally σ-additive it is called a pre-measure and if furthermore $\mathcal{A}$ is a σ-algebra, the content is called a measure. Therefore, every (real-valued) measure is a content, but not vice versa. Contents give a good notion of integrating bounded functions on a space but can behave badly when integrating unbounded functions, while measures give a good notion of integrating unbounded functions.

== Examples ==
A classical example is to define a content on all half open intervals $[a,b) \subseteq \R$ by setting their content to the length of the intervals, that is, $\mu([a,b))=b-a.$ One can further show that this content is actually σ-additive and thus defines a pre-measure on the semiring of all half-open intervals. This can be used to construct the Lebesgue measure for the real number line using Carathéodory's extension theorem. For further details on the general construction see article on Lebesgue measure.

An example of a content that is not a measure on a σ-algebra is the content on all subsets of the positive integers that has value $1/2^n$ on any integer $n$ and is infinite on any infinite subset.

An example of a content on the positive integers that is always finite but is not a measure can be given as follows. Take a positive linear functional on the bounded sequences that is 0 if the sequence has only a finite number of nonzero elements and takes value 1 on the sequence $1, 1, 1, \ldots,$ so the functional in some sense gives an "average value" of any bounded sequence. (Such a functional cannot be constructed explicitly, but exists by the Hahn–Banach theorem.) Then the content of a set of positive integers is the average value of the sequence that is 1 on this set and 0 elsewhere. Informally, one can think of the content of a subset of integers as the "chance" that a randomly chosen integer lies in this subset (though this is not compatible with the usual definitions of chance in probability theory, which assume countable additivity).

== Properties ==
Frequently contents are defined on collections of sets that satisfy further constraints. In this case additional properties can be deduced that fail to hold in general for contents defined on any collections of sets.

=== On semi ring ===
If $\mathcal{A}$ forms a Semi ring of sets then the following statements can be deduced:

- Every content $\mu$ is monotone that is,
  $$A \subseteq B \Rightarrow \mu(A) \leq \mu(B) \text{ for } A, B \in \mathcal{A}.$$
- Every content $\mu$ is sub additive that is,

$\mu(A \cup B) \leq \mu(A) + \mu(B)$ for $A, B \in \mathcal{A}$ such that $A \cup B \in \mathcal{A}.$

=== On rings ===
If furthermore $\mathcal{A}$ is a Ring of sets one gets additionally:

- Subtractive: for $B \subseteq A$ satisfying $\mu (B) < \infty$ it follows $\mu (A \setminus B) = \mu (A) - \mu (B).$
- $A,B\in\mathcal{A} \Rightarrow \mu(A\cup B)+\mu(A\cap B) = \mu(A)+\mu(B).$
- Sub additive: $A_i\in \mathcal{A}\; (i=1,2,\dotsc,n) \Rightarrow \mu\left(\bigcup_{i=1}^n A_i\right)\leq \sum_{i=1}^n \mu(A_i).$
- $\sigma$-Superadditivity: For any we$A_i \in \mathcal{A}\; (i=1,2,\dotsc)\$ pairwise disjoint satisfying $\bigcup_{i=1}^\infty A_i\in \mathcal{A}$ we have $\mu\left(\bigcup_{i=1}^\infty A_i\right) \geq \sum_{i=1}^\infty \mu(A_i).$
- If $\mu$ is a finite content, that is, $A \in\mathcal{A} \Rightarrow \mu(A)<\infty,$ then the inclusion–exclusion principle applies:
  $$\mu\left(\bigcup_{i=1}^nA_i\right) = \sum_{k=1}^n(-1)^{k+1}\!\!\sum_{I\subseteq\{1,\dotsc,n\},\atop |I|=k}\!\!\!\!\mu\left(\bigcap_{i\in I}A_i\right)$$
  where $A_i\in \mathcal{A}$ for all $i\in\{1,\dotsc,n\}.$

== Integration of bounded functions ==
In general integration of functions with respect to a content does not behave well. However, there is a well-behaved notion of integration provided that the function is bounded and the total content of the space is finite, given as follows.

Suppose that the total content of a space is finite. If $f$ is a bounded function on the space such that the inverse image of any open subset of the reals has a content, then we can define the integral of $f$ with respect to the content as
$$\int f \, d\lambda = \lim \sum_{i=1}^n f(\alpha_i)\lambda (f^{-1}(A_i))$$
where the $A_i$ form a finite collections of disjoint half-open sets whose union covers the range of $f,$ and $\alpha_i$ is any element of $A_i,$ and where the limit is taken as the diameters of the sets $A_i$ tend to 0.

== Duals of spaces of bounded functions ==
Suppose that $\mu$ is a measure on some space $X.$ The bounded measurable functions on $X$ form a Banach space with respect to the supremum norm. The positive elements of the dual of this space correspond to bounded contents $\lambda$ $X,$ with the value of $\lambda$ on $f$ given by the integral $\int f \, d\lambda.$ Similarly one can form the space of essentially bounded functions, with the norm given by the essential supremum, and the positive elements of the dual of this space are given by bounded contents that vanish on sets of measure 0.

== Construction of a measure from a content ==
There are several ways to construct a measure μ from a content $\lambda$ on a topological space. This section gives one such method for locally compact Hausdorff spaces such that the content is defined on all compact subsets. In general the measure is not an extension of the content, as the content may fail to be countably additive, and the measure may even be identically zero even if the content is not.

First restrict the content to compact sets. This gives a function $\lambda$ of compact sets $C$ with the following properties:

1. $\lambda(C) \in\ [0, \infty]$ for all compact sets $C$
2. $\lambda(\varnothing) = 0.$
3. $\lambda(C_1) \leq \lambda(C_2) \text{ whenever } C_1\subseteq C_2$
4. $\lambda(C_1 \cup C_2) \leq \lambda(C_1) + \lambda(C_2)$ for all pairs of compact sets
5. $\lambda(C_1 \cup C_2) = \lambda(C_1) + \lambda(C_2)$ for all pairs of disjoint compact sets.

There are also examples of functions $\lambda$ as above not constructed from contents. An example is given by the construction of Haar measure on a locally compact group. One method of constructing such a Hear measure is to produce a left-invariant function $\lambda$ as above on the compact subsets of the group, which can then be extended to a left-invariant measure.

=== Definition on open sets ===
Given λ as above, we define a function μ on all open sets by
$$\mu(U) = \sup_{C\subseteq U} \lambda (C).$$
This has the following properties:

1. $\mu(U) \in\ [0, \infty]$
2. $\mu(\varnothing) = 0$
3. $\mu(U_1) \leq \mu(U_2) \text{ whenever } U_1\subseteq U_2$
4. $\mu\left(\bigcup_nU_n\right) \leq \sum_n\mu\left(U_n\right)$ for any collection of open sets
5. $\mu\left(\bigcup_nU_n\right) = \sum_n\mu\left(U_n\right)$ for any collection of disjoint open sets.

=== Definition on all sets ===
Given μ as above, we extend the function μ to all subsets of the topological space by
$$\mu(A) = \inf_{A\subseteq U}\mu (U).$$
This is an outer measure, in other words it has the following properties:

1. $\mu(A) \in\ [0, \infty]$
2. $\mu(\varnothing) = 0.$
3. $\mu(A_1) \leq \mu(A_2) \text{ whenever } A_1\subseteq A_2$
4. $\mu\left(\bigcup_nA_n\right) \leq \sum_n\mu\left(A_n\right)$ for any countable collection of sets.

=== Construction of a measure ===
The function μ above is an outer measure on the family of all subsets. Therefore, it becomes a measure when restricted to the measurable subsets for the outer measure, which are the subsets $E$ such that $\mu(X) = \mu(X \cap E) + \mu(X \setminus E)$ for all subsets $X.$ If the space is locally compact then every open set is measurable for this measure.

The measure $\mu$ does not necessarily coincide with the content $\lambda$ on compact sets, However it does if $\lambda$ is regular in the sense that for any compact $C,$ $\lambda(C)$ is the inf of $\lambda(D)$ for compact sets $D$ containing $C$ in their interiors.

== See also ==
- Minkowski content
- Jordan content – Extended measure of size in mathematics
