= Nolan Rice Best =

American editor (1871–1930)

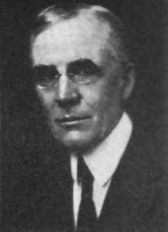
- Born: April 9, 1871; Rich Hill, Ohio, US
- Died: July 18, 1930 (aged 59); Baltimore, Maryland, US
- Education: Oberlin College
- Occupation: Editor

Nolan Rice Best (April 9, 1871 – July 18, 1930) was a periodical editor and prominent layman in the Presbyterian Church. He served as Secretary of the Baltimore Presbyterian Federation of Churches, and as an editor of the Presbyterian weekly periodical The Continent. The periodical consolidated The Interior and Philadelphia's Westminster.

== Biography ==
Nolan Rice Best was born in Rich Hill, Ohio on April 9, 1871. He graduated from Oberlin College in 1892, and was made a Doctor of Letters in 1925.

He died at his home in Baltimore on July 18, 1930.
