= Esfandak Rural District =

Rural district in Sistan and Baluchestan province, Iran

Esfandak Rural District Persian: دهستان اسفندک
- Rural District
- Location within Iran
- Coordinates: 27°03′43″N 62°48′46″E
- Country: Iran
- Province: Sistan and Baluchestan
- County: Saravan
- District: Mehregan
- Capital: Esfandak
- Time zone: UTC+3:30 (IRST)

Esfandak Rural District (Persian: دهستان اسفندک (Note: Formerly Kuhak-e Esfandak Rural District (دهستان كوهك اسفندك))) is in Mehregan District of Saravan County, Sistan and Baluchestan province, Iran. It is administered from the city of Esfandak.

== Demographics ==
=== Population ===
At the time of the 2006 National Census, the rural district's population (as Kuhak-e Esfandak Rural District (Note: Renamed Esfandak Rural District) of Bam Pasht District) was 9,267 in 1,989 households. There were 11,633 inhabitants in 2,596 households at the following census of 2011. At the 2016 census, the population of the rural district was 12,880 in 3,089 households. The most populous of its 57 villages was Kuhak, with 3,201 people.

In 2017, the rural district was separated from its parent district during the establishment of Mehregan District and renamed Esfandak Rural District.
