= Minkowski content =

Computationally feasible measure in real-valued number of dimensions

The Minkowski content (named after Hermann Minkowski), or the boundary measure, of a set is a basic concept that uses concepts from geometry and measure theory to generalize the notions of length of a smooth curve in the plane, and area of a smooth surface in space, to arbitrary measurable sets.

It is typically applied to fractal boundaries of domains in the Euclidean space, but it can also be used in the context of general metric measure spaces.

It is related to, although different from, the Hausdorff measure.

== Definition ==
For $A \subset \mathbb{R}^{n}$, and each integer m with $0 \leq m \leq n$, the m-dimensional upper Minkowski content is

$$M^{*m}(A) = \limsup_{r \to 0^+} \frac{\mu(\{x: d(x,A) < r\})}{\alpha (n-m)r^{n-m}}$$

and the m-dimensional lower Minkowski content is defined as

$$M_*^m(A) = \liminf_{r \to 0^+} \frac{\mu(\{x: d(x,A) < r\})}{\alpha (n-m)r^{n-m}}$$

where $\alpha(n-m)r^{n-m}$ is the volume of the (n−m)-ball of radius r and $\mu$ is an $n$-dimensional Lebesgue measure.

If the upper and lower m-dimensional Minkowski content of A are equal, then their common value is called the Minkowski content M^{m}(A).

== Properties ==
- The Minkowski content is (generally) not a measure. In particular, the m-dimensional Minkowski content in R^{n} is not a measure unless m = 0, in which case it is the counting measure. Indeed, clearly the Minkowski content assigns the same value to the set A as well as its closure.
- If A is a closed m-rectifiable set in R^{n}, given as the image of a bounded set from R^{m} under a Lipschitz function, then the m-dimensional Minkowski content of A exists, and is equal to the m-dimensional Hausdorff measure of A.

== See also ==
- Gaussian isoperimetric inequality
- Geometric measure theory
- Isoperimetric inequality in higher dimensions
- Minkowski–Bouligand dimension
