= Keshtegan Rural District =

Rural district in Sistan and Baluchestan province, Iran

Keshtegan Rural District Persian: دهستان کشتگان
- Rural District
- Location within Iran
- Coordinates: 26°42′02″N 62°51′03″E
- Country: Iran
- Province: Sistan and Baluchestan
- County: Saravan
- District: Bam Pasht
- Capital: Keshtegan

Population (2016)
  - Total: 8,349
- Time zone: UTC+3:30 (IRST)

Keshtegan Rural District (Persian: دهستان کشتگان) is in Bam Pasht District of Saravan County, Sistan and Baluchestan province, Iran. Its capital is the village of Keshtegan.

== Demographics ==
=== Population ===
At the time of the 2006 National Census, the rural district's population was 5,578 in 1,218 households. There were 6,584 inhabitants in 1,460 households at the following census of 2011. The 2016 census measured the population of the rural district as 8,349 in 2,084 households. The most populous of its 32 villages was Haqqabad, with 1,570 people.
