= HMS Content =

Three ships of the Royal Navy have borne the name HMS Content:

- HMS Content (1695) was a 70-gun third rate captured from the French in 1695 and hulked in 1703.
- HMS Content (1708) was a storeship purchased in 1708 and sold in 1715.
- HMS Content (1797) was a 12-gun gunvessel launched in 1797 and wrecked in 1799 (although there is some doubt about this vessel, which may have been a hired brig).
