= Chacheragh =

Chacheragh چاچراغ
- Village
- Location within Iran
- Coordinates: 28°21′00″N 60°24′00″E
- Country: Iran
- Province: Sistan and Baluchestan
- County: Khash
- Bakhsh: Nukabad
- Rural District: Gowhar Kuh

Population (2006)
  - Total: 33
- Time zone: UTC+3:30 (IRST)
  - Summer (DST): UTC+4:30 (IRDT)

Chacheragh (Persian: چاچراغ (حق اباد), also Romanized as Chācherāgh; also known as Ḩaqqābād) is a village in Gowhar Kuh Rural District, Nukabad District, Khash County, Sistan and Baluchestan Province, Iran. At the 2006 census, its population was 33, in 6 families.
