= Rich Hill (Ohio) =

Coordinates: 40°19′28″N 82°43′28″W

Rich Hill is a summit in Knox County, Ohio, in the United States. With an elevation of 1,358 feet (414 m), Rich Hill is the 10th highest summit in the state of Ohio.

An ancient cairn once stood at the top of Rich Hill until its stones were salvaged by early settlers.
