= Pas Kuhak =

Pas Kuhak پس كوهك
- Village
- Location within Iran
- Coordinates: 29°43′36″N 52°16′59″E
- Country: Iran
- Province: Fars
- County: Shiraz
- Bakhsh: Arzhan
- Rural District: Qarah Chaman

Population (2006)
  - Total: 120
- Time zone: UTC+3:30 (IRST)
  - Summer (DST): UTC+4:30 (IRDT)

Pas Kuhak (Persian: پس كوهك, also Romanized as Pas Kūhak) is a village in Qarah Chaman Rural District, Arzhan District, Shiraz County, Fars province, Iran. At the 2006 census, its population was 120, in 27 families.
