= Kont Bank =

Bank of Tajikistan

- Type: Investment bank
- Industry: Financial services
- Founded: 2010
- Founder: Babak Zanjani
- Defunct: 2017
- Fate: Renamed
- Successor: Bonki Osiyo
- Headquarters: Dushanbe, Tajikistan
- Area served: Asia
- Key people: Fayzullo Salikhov (Acting Chairman)
- Website: kontinvestmentbank.tj

Kont Investment Bank was a Tajiki investment bank operating in Dushanbe, under license from National Bank of Tajikistan. The bank's chairman was Fayzullo Salikhov. On March 30, 2017, the bank was renamed Bank Asia (Bonki Osiyo).

== History ==
The Kont Investment Bank was founded in 2011 by Iranian entrepreneur Babak Zanjani, who held investments in several Tajik businesses, including a bank, an airline, a taxi service, and a bus terminal that Tajik President Imomali Rahmon himself helped inaugurate in March 2013. The bank came under scrutiny by the US Treasury Service, as a possible money laundering entity which was suspected of moving large sums of oil-related money on behalf the Iranian government.

Zanjani reportedly sold the bank in 2015, and was then wholly owned by R. S. Saidov.
