= Mehregan District =

District in Sistan and Baluchestan province, Iran

Mehregan District Persian: بخش مهرگان
- District
- Location within Iran
- Coordinates: 27°03′48″N 62°59′08″E
- Country: Iran
- Province: Sistan and Baluchestan
- County: Saravan
- Capital: Esfandak
- Time zone: UTC+3:30 (IRST)

Mehregan District (Persian: بخش مهرگان) is in Saravan County, Sistan and Baluchestan province, Iran. Its capital is the city of Esfandak, whose population at the time of the 2016 National Census was 2,962 people in 725 households.

== History ==
In August 2017, Kuhak-e Esfandak Rural District (Note: Renamed Esfandak Rural District) was separated from Bam Pasht District in the formation of Mehregan District. In November 2021, the village of Esfandak was elevated to the status of a city.

== Demographics ==
=== Administrative divisions ===
Mehregan District
Administrative Divisions
Esfandak RD (Note: Formerly Kuhak-e Esfandak Rural District)
Kuhak RD
Esfandak (city) (Note: Became a city after the 2016 census)
RD = Rural District
