= Kalleh Gan Rural District =

Rural district in Sistan and Baluchestan province, Iran

Kalleh Gan Rural District Persian: دهستان کله گان
- Rural District
- Location within Iran
- Coordinates: 27°29′30″N 62°46′45″E
- Country: Iran
- Province: Sistan and Baluchestan
- County: Golshan
- District: Kalleh Gan
- Capital: Kalleh Din

Population (2016)
  - Total: 6,962
- Time zone: UTC+3:30 (IRST)

Kalleh Gan Rural District (Persian: دهستان کله گان) is in Kalleh Gan District of Golshan County, Sistan and Baluchestan province, Iran. Its capital is the village of Kalleh Din.

== Demographics ==
=== Population ===
At the time of the 2006 National Census, the rural district's population (as a part of Jaleq District (Note: Renamed the Central District of Golshan County) in Saravan County) was 2,933 in 552 households. There were 3,877 inhabitants in 998 households at the following census of 2011. The 2016 census measured the population of the rural district as 6,962 in 1,924 households. The most populous of its 35 villages was Lechi, with 1,316 people.

In 2019, the district was separated from the county in the establishment of Golshan County and renamed the Central District. The rural district was transferred to the new Kalleh Gan District.
