= Content security =

Content security may refer to:

- Network security, the provisions and policies adopted to prevent and monitor unauthorized access, misuse, modification, or denial of a computer network
- Content filtering, software designed and optimized for controlling what content is permitted to a reader via the Internet
- Digital rights management, a class of technologies used by manufacturers, publishers, copyright holders, and individuals to control the use of digital content and devices after sale

== See also ==
- Content Security Policy
- Buzzword
