= Kont Rural District =

Rural district in Sistan and Baluchestan province, Iran

Kont Rural District Persian: دهستان کنت
- Rural District
- Location within Iran
- Coordinates: 26°55′55″N 61°58′19″E
- Country: Iran
- Province: Sistan and Baluchestan
- County: Sib and Suran
- District: Hiduj
- Capital: Kont

Population (2016)
  - Total: 11,763
- Time zone: UTC+3:30 (IRST)

Kont Rural District (Persian: دهستان کنت) is in Hiduj District of Sib and Suran County, Sistan and Baluchestan province, Iran. Its capital is the village of Kont.

== Demographics ==
=== Population ===
At the time of the 2006 National Census, the rural district's population (as a part of Saravan County) was 9,224 in 1,871 households. There were 11,042 inhabitants in 2,449 households at the following census of 2011, by which time the district had been separated from the county in the establishment of Sib and Suran County. The 2016 census measured the population of the rural district as 11,763 in 3,113 households. The most populous of its 44 villages was Kont, with 3,199 people.
