= Continence =

Continence may refer to:

- Fecal continence, the ability to control defecation, see Fecal incontinence
- Urinary continence, the ability to control urination, see Urinary incontinence, the involuntary excretion of urine
- Sexual continence, a synonym of Coitus reservatus
- Sexual abstinence
- Incontinence (philosophy), a lack of self-control (Greek: ἀκρασία)
