= Sib and Suran Rural District =

Rural district in Sistan and Baluchestan province, Iran

Sib and Suran Rural District Persian: دهستان سیب و سوران
- Rural District
- Location within Iran
- Coordinates: 27°18′30″N 62°03′00″E
- Country: Iran
- Province: Sistan and Baluchestan
- County: Sib and Suran
- District: Central
- Capital: Suran

Population (2016)
  - Total: 32,999
- Time zone: UTC+3:30 (IRST)

Sib and Suran Rural District (Persian: دهستان سیب و سوران) is in the Central District of Sib and Suran County, Sistan and Baluchestan province, Iran. It is administered from the city of Suran.

== Demographics ==
=== Population ===
At the time of the 2006 National Census, the rural district's population (as a part of the former Sib and Suran District of Saravan County) was 24,420 in 5,051 households. There were 28,005 inhabitants in 6,828 households at the following census of 2011, by which time the district had been separated from the county in the establishment of Sib and Suran County. The rural district was transferred to the new Central District. The 2016 census measured the population of the rural district as 32,999 in 8,284 households. The most populous of its 124 villages was Sib (now a city), with 892 people.
