= Jaleq =

City in Sistan and Baluchestan province, Iran

Jaleq Persian: جالق
- City
- Location within Iran
- Coordinates: 27°36′12″N 62°42′35″E
- Country: Iran
- Province: Sistan and Baluchestan
- County: Golshan
- District: Central District

Population (2016)
  - Total: 18,098
- Time zone: UTC+3:30 (IRST)

Jaleq (Persian: جالق) (Note: Also romanized as Jālaq, Jāl'q, and Jālq; also known as Jālk, Kashān, Khooshab, Khūshāb, and Khvoshāb) is a city in the Central District (Note: Formerly Jaleq District of Saravan County) of Golshan County, Sistan and Baluchestan province, Iran, serving as capital of both the county the district.

Jālq (native pronunciation) is Iran's easternmost city. Jaleq is near the border with Pakistan and is mainly inhabited by Iranian Baluchis. The name Jaleq is Persian and means "the trodden place."

== Demographics ==
=== Population ===
At the time of the 2006 National Census, the city's population was 13,903 in 2,594 households, when it was in Jaleq District (Note: Renamed the Central District of Golshan County) of Saravan County. The following census in 2011 counted 17,546 people in 3,566 households. The 2016 census measured the population of the city as 18,098 people in 4,719 households.

In 2019, the district was separated from the county in the establishment of Golshan County and renamed the Central District, with Jaleq as the county's capital.
