= The Eclectic Moniker =

Danish musical collective

The Eclectic Moniker is a musical collective from Odense, Denmark consisting of various Danish musicians. The collective is called "eclectic" because it draws from multiple influences and styles to gain complementary insights into music. It plays indie pop mixed with 3rd world / calypso influences.

The collective formed in February 2010 fronting singer songwriter Frederik Vedersø. Originally it started as a trio with a great number of others joining in at later dates. Its self-titled debut album The Eclectic Moniker went straight into #9 in its week of release in 2012. The single released on 18 February 2012 and called "Easter Island" has become a great radio hit.

From its inception, the band toured Denmark and Germany, received airplay on both Danish and German radio. Their appearance at a gig at Start! Festival 2010 in Copenhagen gave them many fans. So did EPs Hometapes (with 5 tracks) and A Part of Something Bigger (with 4 tracks). The band shot to fame after appearing in 2011 in P3's KarriereKanonen, a music talent show on Danish DR P3 giving a chance for singers and bands who want to play their music and if they get enough attention, a possible record deal. The Eclectic Moniker took part in the Roskilde Festival 2011 and on 12 January 2012 won the Talent Prize for $15,000 at the "Odense live prisen" held in Odense.

== Members ==
- Frederik Vedersø (Guitar, vocals)
- Jens Kristian Siqueira (Percussion, vocals)
- Peter Kohlmetz Møller (Keyboards, vocals)
- Tobias Sødring (Guitar)
- Tune Madsen (Drums)
- Esben Beldring (Samples, percussion, vocals)
- Anders Thambo (Bass)

== Discography ==
=== Albums ===
Year	Song	Peak position	Certification
Year	Song	DK	Certification
2012	The Eclectic Moniker	9	
2013	Continents		
2016	Mirror Twin		

=== EPs ===
- 2010: Hometapes
- 2011: A Part of Something Bigger

=== Singles ===
- 2012: "Easter Island"
- 2012: "Going To Paris"
