= Continent (airline) =

Russian airline

IATA	ICAO	Call sign
LK	CNE	CONTINENT
- Founded: 2010
- Ceased operations: 2011
- Hubs: Vnukovo International Airport
- Fleet size: 14
- Headquarters: Moscow, Russia

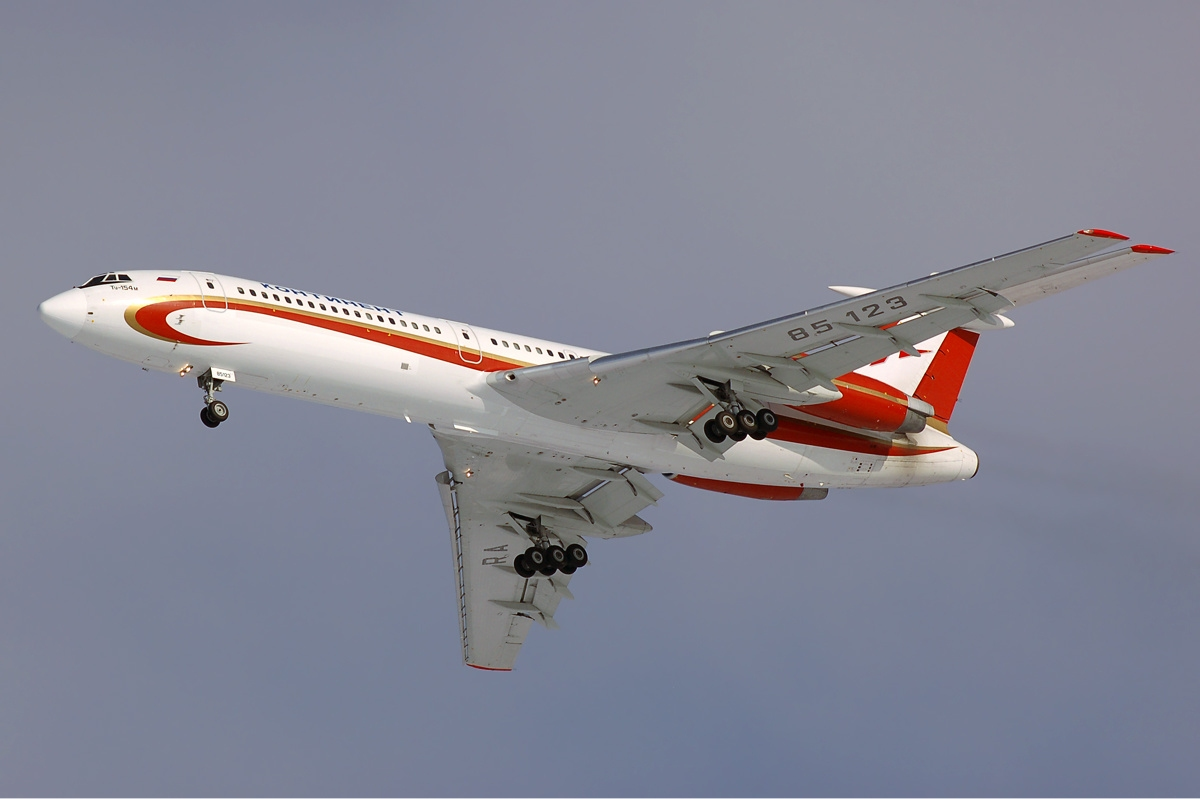
Continent Airlines Tupolev Tu-154, Moscow, 2011

Continent was an airline based in Moscow, Russia. Its main base was Vnukovo International Airport.

== History ==
Continent started passenger services in early 2010 but ceased operations on July 29, 2011 due to poor customer response and a lack of funds.

== Fleet ==
The Continent fleet included the following aircraft (as of 6 July 2011):

Continent fleet
Aircraft	Total	Orders	Passengers (Economy)	Notes
Tupolev Tu-154M	11	0	-	
Ilyushin Il-76	3	0	-	
Total	14	0		
