= Pre-measure =

Set function that is a precursor to a measure

In mathematics, a pre-measure is a set function that is, in some sense, a precursor to a bona fide measure on a given space. Indeed, one of the fundamental theorems in measure theory states that a pre-measure can be extended to a measure.

== Definition ==
Let $R$ be a ring of subsets (closed under union and relative complement) of a fixed set $X$ and let $\mu_0 : R \to [0, \infty]$ be a set function. $\mu_0$ is called a pre-measure if
$$\mu_0(\varnothing) = 0$$
and, for every countable (or finite) sequence $A_1, A_2, \ldots \in R$ of pairwise disjoint sets whose union lies in $R,$
$$\mu_0 \left(\bigcup_{n=1}^\infty A_n\right) = \sum_{n=1}^\infty \mu_0(A_n).$$
The second property is called $\sigma$-additivity.

Thus, what is missing for a pre-measure to be a measure is that it is not necessarily defined on a sigma-algebra (or a sigma-ring).

== Carathéodory's extension theorem ==
It turns out that pre-measures give rise quite naturally to outer measures, which are defined for all subsets of the space $X.$ More precisely, if $\mu_0$ is a pre-measure defined on a ring of subsets $R$ of the space $X,$ then the set function $\mu^*$ defined by
$$\mu^* (S) = \inf \left\{\left. \sum_{i=1}^{\infty} \mu_0(A_i) \right| A_i \in R, S \subseteq \bigcup_{i=1}^{\infty} A_i\right\}$$
is an outer measure on $X$ and the measure $\mu$ induced by $\mu^*$ on the $\sigma$-algebra $\Sigma$ of Carathéodory-measurable sets satisfies $\mu(A) = \mu_0(A)$ for $A \in R$ (in particular, $\Sigma$ includes $R$). The infimum of the empty set is taken to be $+\infty.$

(Note that there is some variation in the terminology used in the literature. For example, Rogers (1998) uses "measure" and "pre-measure" where this article uses terms "outer measure" and "set function", respectively. Outer measures are not, in general, measures, since they may fail to be $\sigma$-additive.)

== See also ==
- Hahn-Kolmogorov theorem – Theorem extending pre-measures to measures

Families $\mathcal{F}$ of sets over $\Omega$
Is necessarily true of $\mathcal{F}\colon$ or, is $\mathcal{F}$ closed under:	Directed by $\,\supseteq$	$A \cap B$	$A \cup B$	$B \setminus A$	$\Omega \setminus A$	$A_1 \cap A_2 \cap \cdots$	$A_1 \cup A_2 \cup \cdots$	$\Omega \in \mathcal{F}$	$\varnothing \in \mathcal{F}$	F.I.P.
π-system	Yes	Yes	No	No	No	No	No	No	No	No
Semiring	Yes	Yes	No	No	No	No	No	No	Yes	Never
Semialgebra (Semifield)	Yes	Yes	No	No	No	No	No	No	Yes	Never
Monotone class	No	No	No	No	No	only if $A_i \searrow$	only if $A_i \nearrow$	No	No	No
𝜆-system (Dynkin System)	Yes	No	No	only if $A \subseteq B$	Yes	No	only if $A_i \nearrow$ or they are disjoint	Yes	Yes	Never
Ring (Order theory)	Yes	Yes	Yes	No	No	No	No	No	No	No
Ring (Measure theory)	Yes	Yes	Yes	Yes	No	No	No	No	Yes	Never
δ-Ring	Yes	Yes	Yes	Yes	No	Yes	No	No	Yes	Never
𝜎-Ring	Yes	Yes	Yes	Yes	No	Yes	Yes	No	Yes	Never
Algebra (Field)	Yes	Yes	Yes	Yes	Yes	No	No	Yes	Yes	Never
𝜎-Algebra (𝜎-Field)	Yes	Yes	Yes	Yes	Yes	Yes	Yes	Yes	Yes	Never
Filter	Yes	Yes	Yes	No	No	No	Yes	Yes	No	No
Proper filter	Yes	Yes	Yes	Never	Never	No	Yes	Yes	Never	Yes
Prefilter (Filter base)	Yes	No	No	No	No	No	No	No	No	Yes
Filter subbase	No	No	No	No	No	No	No	No	No	Yes
Open Topology	Yes	Yes	Yes	No	No	No	(even arbitrary $\cup$)	Yes	Yes	Never
Closed Topology	Yes	Yes	Yes	No	No	(even arbitrary $\cap$)	No	Yes	Yes	Never
Is necessarily true of $\mathcal{F}\colon$ or, is $\mathcal{F}$ closed under:	directed downward	finite intersections	finite unions	relative complements	complements in $\Omega$	countable intersections	countable unions	contains $\Omega$	contains $\varnothing$	Finite; Intersection; Property
Additionally, a semiring is a π-system where every complement $B \setminus A$ is equal to a finite disjoint union of sets in $\mathcal{F}.$ A semialgebra is a semiring where every complement $\Omega \setminus A$ is equal to a finite disjoint union of sets in $\mathcal{F}.$ $A, B, A_1, A_2, \ldots$ are arbitrary elements of $\mathcal{F}$ and it is assumed that $\mathcal{F} \neq \varnothing.$
