= Central District (Sib and Suran County) =

District in Sistan and Baluchestan province, Iran

Central District (Sib and Suran County) Persian: بخش مرکزی شهرستان سیب و سوران
- District
- Location within Iran
- Coordinates: 27°17′40″N 61°59′45″E
- Country: Iran
- Province: Sistan and Baluchestan
- County: Sib and Suran
- Capital: Suran

Population (2016)
  - Total: 62,876
- Time zone: UTC+3:30 (IRST)

The Central District of Sib and Suran County (Persian: بخش مرکزی شهرستان سیب و سوران) is in Sistan and Baluchestan province, Iran. Its capital is the city of Suran.

== History ==
After the 2006 National Census, Hiduj and Sib and Suran Districts were separated from Saravan County in the establishment of Sib and Suran County, which was divided into two districts of two rural districts each, with Suran as its capital.

After the 2016 census, Shandan Rural District was established in the Central District, and Paskuh Rural District was separated from it in the formation of Paskuh District. Additionally, the village of Sib was elevated to the status of a city.

== Demographics ==
=== Population ===
At the time of the 2011 census, the district's population was 52,668 people in 12,525 households. The 2016 census measured the population of the district as 62,876 inhabitants in 15,791 households.

=== Administrative divisions ===
Central District (Sib and Suran County) Population
Administrative Divisions	2011	2016
Paskuh RD (Note: Transferred to Paskuh District after the 2016 census)	14,031	16,297
Shandan RD (Note: Established after the 2016 census)		
Sib and Suran RD	28,005	32,999
Sib (city) (Note: Became a city after the 2016 census)		
Suran (city)	10,632	13,580
Total	52,668	62,876
RD = Rural District
