= Dimension function =

In mathematics, the notion of an (exact) dimension function (also known as a gauge function) is a tool in the study of fractals and other subsets of metric spaces. Dimension functions are a generalisation of the simple "diameter to the dimension" power law used in the construction of s-dimensional Hausdorff measure.

== Motivation: s-dimensional Hausdorff measure ==
Consider a metric space (X, d) and a subset E of X. Given a number s ≥ 0, the s-dimensional Hausdorff measure of E, denoted μ^{s}(E), is defined by

$$\mu^{s} (E) = \lim_{\delta \to  0} \mu_{\delta}^{s} (E),$$

where

$$\mu_{\delta}^{s} (E) = \inf \left\{ \left. \sum_{i = 1}^{\infty} \mathrm{diam} (C_{i})^{s} \right| \mathrm{diam} (C_{i}) \leq \delta, \bigcup_{i = 1}^{\infty} C_{i} \supseteq E \right\}.$$

μ_{δ}^{s}(E) can be thought of as an approximation to the "true" s-dimensional area/volume of E given by calculating the minimal s-dimensional area/volume of a covering of E by sets of diameter at most δ.

As a function of increasing s, μ^{s}(E) is non-increasing. In fact, for all values of s, except possibly one, H^{s}(E) is either 0 or +∞; this exceptional value is called the Hausdorff dimension of E, here denoted dim_{H}(E). Intuitively speaking, μ^{s}(E) = +∞ for s < dim_{H}(E) for the same reason as the 1-dimensional linear length of a 2-dimensional disc in the Euclidean plane is +∞; likewise, μ^{s}(E) = 0 for s > dim_{H}(E) for the same reason as the 3-dimensional volume of a disc in the Euclidean plane is zero.

The idea of a dimension function is to use different functions of diameter than just diam(C)^{s} for some s, and to look for the same property of the Hausdorff measure being finite and non-zero.

== Definition ==
Let (X, d) be a metric space and E ⊆ X. Let h : [0, +∞) → [0, +∞] be a function. Define μ^{h}(E) by

$$\mu^{h} (E) = \lim_{\delta \to  0} \mu_{\delta}^{h} (E),$$

where

$$\mu_{\delta}^{h} (E) = \inf \left\{ \left. \sum_{i = 1}^{\infty} h \left( \mathrm{diam} (C_{i}) \right) \right| \mathrm{diam} (C_{i}) \leq \delta, \bigcup_{i = 1}^{\infty} C_{i} \supseteq E \right\}.$$

Then h is called an (exact) dimension function (or gauge function) for E if μ^{h}(E) is finite and strictly positive. There are many conventions as to the properties that h should have: Rogers (1998), for example, requires that h should be monotonically increasing for t ≥ 0, strictly positive for t > 0, and continuous on the right for all t ≥ 0.

=== Packing dimension ===
Packing dimension is constructed in a very similar way to Hausdorff dimension, except that one "packs" E from inside with pairwise disjoint balls of diameter at most δ. Just as before, one can consider functions h : [0, +∞) → [0, +∞] more general than h(δ) = δ^{s} and call h an exact dimension function for E if the h-packing measure of E is finite and strictly positive.

== Example ==
Almost surely, a sample path X of Brownian motion in the Euclidean plane has Hausdorff dimension equal to 2, but the 2-dimensional Hausdorff measure μ^{2}(X) is zero. The exact dimension function h is given by the logarithmic correction

$$h(r) = r^{2} \cdot \log \frac1{r} \cdot \log \log \log \frac1{r}.$$

I.e., with probability one, 0 < μ^{h}(X) < +∞ for a Brownian path X in R^{2}. For Brownian motion in Euclidean n-space R^{n} with n ≥ 3, the exact dimension function is

$$h(r) = r^{2} \cdot \log \log \frac1r.$$
