= Suran, Sistan and Baluchestan =

City in Sistan and Baluchestan province, Iran

Suran Persian: سیب
- City
- Location within Iran
- Coordinates: 27°17′18″N 61°59′59″E
- Country: Iran
- Province: Sistan and Baluchestan
- County: Sib and Suran
- District: Central

Population (2016)
  - Total: 13,580
- Time zone: UTC+3:30 (IRST)

Suran (Persian: سوران) (Note: Also romanized as Sooran and Sūrān; also known as Sūrār) is a city in the Central District of Sib and Suran County, Sistan and Baluchestan province, Iran, serving as capital of both the county and the district. It is also the administrative center for Sib and Suran Rural District.

== Demographics ==
=== Population ===
At the time of the 2006 National Census, the city's population was 9,966 in 1,886 households, when it was capital of the former Sib and Suran District of Saravan County. The following census in 2011 counted 10,632 people in 2,463 households, by which time the district had been separated from the county in the establishment of Sib and Suran County. The city and the rural district were transferred to the new Central District, with Suran as the county's capital. The 2016 census measured the population of the city as 13,580 people in 3,357 households.
