= Carathéodory's extension theorem =

Theorem extending pre-measures to measures

In measure theory, Carathéodory's extension theorem (named after the mathematician Constantin Carathéodory) states that any pre-measure defined on a given ring of subsets R of a given set Ω can be extended to a measure on the σ-ring generated by R, and this extension is unique if the pre-measure is σ-finite. Consequently, any pre-measure on a ring containing all intervals of real numbers can be extended to the Borel algebra of the set of real numbers. This is an extremely powerful result of measure theory, and leads, for example, to the Lebesgue measure.

The theorem is also sometimes known as the Carathéodory–Fréchet extension theorem, the Carathéodory–Hopf extension theorem, the Hopf extension theorem and the Hahn–Kolmogorov extension theorem.

== Introductory statement ==
Several very similar statements of the theorem can be given. A slightly more involved one, based on semi-rings of sets, is given further down below. A shorter, simpler statement is as follows. In this form, it is often called the Hahn–Kolmogorov theorem.

Let $\Sigma_0$ be an algebra of subsets of a set $X.$ Consider a set function
$$\mu_0 : \Sigma_0 \to [0, \infty]$$
that is sigma additive, meaning that
$$\mu_0\left(\bigcup_{n=1}^\infty A_n\right) = \sum_{n=1}^\infty \mu_0(A_n)$$
for any disjoint family $\{A_n : n \in \N\}$ of elements of $\Sigma_0$ such that $\cup_{n=1}^\infty A_n \in \Sigma_0.$ (Functions $\mu_0$ obeying these two properties are known as pre-measures.) Then, $\mu_0$ extends to a measure defined on the $\sigma$-algebra $\Sigma$ generated by $\Sigma_0$; that is, there exists a measure
$$\mu : \Sigma \to [0, \infty]$$
such that its restriction to $\Sigma_0$ coincides with $\mu_0.$

If $\mu_0$ is $\sigma$-finite, then the extension is unique.

=== Comments ===
This theorem is remarkable for it allows one to construct a measure by first defining it on a small algebra of sets, where its sigma additivity could be easy to verify, and then this theorem guarantees its extension to a sigma-algebra. The proof of this theorem is not trivial, since it requires extending $\mu_0$ from an algebra of sets to a potentially much bigger sigma-algebra, guaranteeing that the extension is unique (if $\mu_0$ is $\sigma$-finite), and moreover that it does not fail to satisfy the sigma-additivity of the original function.

== Semi-ring and ring ==
=== Definitions ===
For a given set $\Omega,$ we call a family $\mathcal{S}$ of subsets of $\Omega$ a semi-ring of sets if it has the following properties:

- $\varnothing \in \mathcal{S}$
- For all $A, B \in \mathcal{S},$ we have $A \cap B \in \mathcal{S}$ (closed under pairwise intersections)
- For all $A, B \in \mathcal{S},$ there exists a finite number of disjoint sets $K_i \in \mathcal{S}, i = 1, 2, \ldots, n,$ such that $A \setminus B = \coprod_{i=1}^n K_i$ (relative complements can be written as finite disjoint unions).

The first property can be replaced with $\mathcal{S} \neq \varnothing$ since $A \in \mathcal{S} \implies A \setminus A = \varnothing \in \mathcal{S}.$

With the same notation, we call a family $\mathcal{R}$ of subsets of $\Omega$ a ring of sets if it has the following properties:

- $\varnothing \in \mathcal{R}$
- For all $A, B \in \mathcal{R},$ we have $A \cup B \in \mathcal{R}$ (closed under pairwise unions)
- For all $A, B \in \mathcal{R},$ we have $A \setminus B \in \mathcal{R}$ (closed under relative complements).

Thus, any ring on $\Omega$ is also a semi-ring.

Sometimes, the following constraint is added in the measure theory context:

- $\Omega$ is the disjoint union of a countable family of sets in $\mathcal{S}.$

A field of sets (respectively, a semi-field) is a ring (respectively, a semi-ring) that also contains $\Omega$ as one of its elements.

=== Properties ===
- Arbitrary (possibly uncountable) intersections of rings on $\Omega$ are still rings on $\Omega.$
- If $A$ is a non-empty subset of the powerset $\mathcal{P}(\Omega)$ of $\Omega,$ then we define the ring generated by $A$ (noted $R(A)$) as the intersection of all rings containing $A.$ It is straightforward to see that the ring generated by $A$ is the smallest ring containing $A.$
- For a semi-ring $S,$ the set of all finite unions of sets in $S$ is the ring generated by $S:$
  $$R(S) = \left\{A : A = \bigcup_{i=1}^n A_i, A_i \in S\right\}$$
  (One can show that $R(S)$ is equal to the set of all finite disjoint unions of sets in $S$).
- A content $\mu$ defined on a semi-ring $S$ can be extended on the ring generated by $S.$ Such an extension is unique. The extended content can be written:
  $$\mu(A) = \sum_{i=1}^n \mu(A_i)$$
  for $A = \bigcup_{i=1}^n A_i,$ with the $A_i \in S$ disjoint.

In addition, it can be proved that $\mu$ is a pre-measure if and only if the extended content is also a pre-measure, and that any pre-measure on $R(S)$ that extends the pre-measure on $S$ is necessarily of this form.

=== Motivation ===
In measure theory, we are not interested in semi-rings and rings themselves, but rather in σ-algebras generated by them. The idea is that it is possible to build a pre-measure on a semi-ring $S$ (for example Stieltjes measures), which can then be extended to a pre-measure on $R(S),$ which can finally be extended to a measure on a σ-algebra through Caratheodory's extension theorem. As σ-algebras generated by semi-rings and rings are the same, the difference does not really matter (in the measure theory context at least). Actually, Carathéodory's extension theorem can be slightly generalized by replacing ring by semi-field.

The definition of semi-ring may seem a bit convoluted, but the following example shows why it is useful (moreover it allows us to give an explicit representation of the smallest ring containing some semi-ring).

=== Example ===
Think about the subset of $\mathcal{P}(\R)$ defined by the set of all half-open intervals $[a, b)$ for a and b reals. This is a semi-ring, but not a ring. Stieltjes measures are defined on intervals; the countable additivity on the semi-ring is not too difficult to prove because we only consider countable unions of intervals which are intervals themselves. Proving it for arbitrary countable unions of intervals is accomplished using Caratheodory's theorem.

== Statement of the theorem ==
Let $R$ be a ring of sets on $X$ and let $\mu : R \to [0, +\infty]$ be a pre-measure on $R,$ meaning that $\mu(\varnothing) = 0$ and for all sets $A \in R$ for which there exists a countable decomposition $A = \coprod_{i=1}^\infty A_i$ as a union of disjoint sets $A_1, A_2, \ldots \in R,$ we have
$$\mu(A) = \sum_{i=1}^\infty \mu(A_i).$$

Let $\sigma(R)$ be the $\sigma$-algebra generated by $R.$ The pre-measure condition is a necessary condition for $\mu$ to be the restriction to $R$ of a measure on $\sigma(R).$ The Carathéodory's extension theorem states that it is also sufficient, that is, there exists a measure $\mu^\prime : \sigma(R) \to [0, +\infty]$ such that $\mu^\prime$ is an extension of $\mu;$ that is, $\mu^\prime\big\vert_R = \mu.$ Moreover, if $\mu$ is $\sigma$-finite then the extension $\mu^\prime$ is unique (and also $\sigma$-finite).

=== Proof sketch ===
First extend $\mu$ to an outer measure $\mu^*$ on the power set $2^X$ of $X$ by
$$\mu^*(T) = \inf \left\{\sum_n \mu\left(S_n\right) : T \subseteq \cup_n S_n \text{ with } S_1, S_2, \ldots \in R\right\}$$
and then restrict it to the set $\mathcal{B}$ of $\mu^*$-measurable sets (that is, Carathéodory-measurable sets), which is the set of all $M \subseteq X$ such that $\mu^*(S) = \mu^*(S \cap M) + \mu^*(S \cap M^{\mathrm{c}})$ for every $S \subseteq X.$ $\mathcal{B}$ is a $\sigma$-algebra, and $\mu^*$ is $\sigma$-additive on it, by the Caratheodory lemma.

It remains to check that $\mathcal{B}$ contains $R.$ That is, to verify that every set in $R$ is $\mu^*$-measurable. This is done by basic measure theory techniques of dividing and adding up sets.

For uniqueness, take any other extension $\nu$ so it remains to show that $\nu = \mu^*.$ By $\sigma$-additivity, uniqueness can be reduced to the case where $\mu(X)$ is finite, which will now be assumed.

Now we could concretely prove $\nu = \mu^*$ on $\sigma(R)$ by using the Borel hierarchy of $R,$ and since $\nu = \mu^*$ at the base level, we can use well-ordered induction to reach the level of $\omega_1,$ the level of $\sigma(R).$

== Examples of non-uniqueness of extension ==
Although the Carathéodory extension is unique (by construction), there can be more than one extension of a pre-measure to the generated σ-algebra, if the pre-measure is not $\sigma$-finite, even if the extensions themselves are $\sigma$-finite (see example "Via rationals" below).

=== Via the counting measure ===
Take the algebra generated by all half-open intervals [a,b) on the real line, and give such intervals measure infinity if they are non-empty. The Carathéodory extension gives all non-empty sets measure infinity. Another extension is given by the counting measure.

=== Via rationals ===
This example is a more detailed variation of the above. A rational closed-open interval is any subset of $\mathbb{Q}$ of the form $[a,b)$, where $a, b \in \mathbb{Q}$.

Let $X$ be $\mathbb{Q}\cap[0,1)$ and let $\Sigma_0$ be the algebra of all finite unions of rational closed-open intervals contained in $\mathbb{Q}\cap[0,1)$. It is easy to prove that $\Sigma_0$ is, in fact, an algebra. It is also easy to see that the cardinal of every non-empty set in $\Sigma_0$ is countably infinite ($\aleph_0$).

Let $\mu_0$ be the counting set function ($\#$) defined in $\Sigma_0$. It is clear that $\mu_0$ is finitely additive and $\sigma$-additive in $\Sigma_0$. Since every non-empty set in $\Sigma_0$ is infinite, then, for every non-empty set $A\in\Sigma_0$, $\mu_0(A)=+\infty$

Now, let $\Sigma$ be the $\sigma$-algebra generated by $\Sigma_0$. It is easy to see that $\Sigma$ is the $\sigma$-algebra of all subsets of $X$, and both $\#$ and $2\#$ are measures defined on $\Sigma$ and both are extensions of $\mu_0$. Note that, in this case, the two extensions are $\sigma$-finite, because $X$ is countable.

=== Via Fubini's theorem ===
Another example is closely related to the failure of some forms of Fubini's theorem for spaces that are not σ-finite. Suppose that $X$ is the unit interval with Lebesgue measure and $Y$ is the unit interval with the discrete counting measure. Let the ring $R$ be generated by products $A\times B$ where $A$ is Lebesgue measurable and $B$ is any subset, and give this set the measure $\mu(A)\text{card}(B)$. This has a very large number of different extensions to a measure; for example:

- The measure of a subset is the sum of the measures of its horizontal sections. This is the smallest possible extension. Here the diagonal has measure 0.
- The measure of a subset is $\int_0^1n(x)dx$ where $n(x)$ is the number of points of the subset with given $x$-coordinate. The diagonal has measure 1.
- The Carathéodory extension, which is the largest possible extension. Any subset of finite measure is contained in some union of a countable number of horizontal lines. In particular the diagonal has measure infinity.

== See also ==
- Outer measure: the proof of Carathéodory's extension theorem is based upon the outer measure concept.
- Loeb measures, constructed using Carathéodory's extension theorem.
