= Paskuh Rural District (Sib and Suran County) =

Rural district in Sistan and Baluchestan province, Iran

Paskuh Rural District Persian: دهستان پسکوه
- Rural District
- Location within Iran
- Coordinates: 27°32′21″N 61°39′47″E
- Country: Iran
- Province: Sistan and Baluchestan
- County: Sib and Suran
- District: Paskuh
- Capital: Kahn-e Karim

Population (2016)
  - Total: 16,297
- Time zone: UTC+3:30 (IRST)

Paskuh Rural District (Persian: دهستان پسکوه) is in Paskuh District of Sib and Suran County, Sistan and Baluchestan province, Iran. Its capital is the village of Kahn-e Karim. The previous capital of the rural district was the village of Paskuh.

== Demographics ==
=== Population ===
At the time of the 2006 National Census, the rural district's population (as a part of the former Sib and Suran District of Saravan County) was 9,655 in 2,096 households. There were 14,031 inhabitants in 3,234 households at the following census of 2011, by which time the district had been separated from the county in the establishment of Sib and Suran County. The rural district was transferred to the new Central District. The 2016 census measured the population of the rural district as 16,297 in 4,150 households. The most populous of its 106 villages was Paskuh, with 4,048 people.

After the census, the rural district was separated from the district in the formation of Paskuh District.
