= Hiduj District =

District in Sistan and Baluchestan province, Iran

Hiduj District Persian: بخش هیدوچ
- District
- Location within Iran
- Coordinates: 26°51′04″N 62°09′37″E
- Country: Iran
- Province: Sistan and Baluchestan
- County: Sib and Suran
- Capital: Hiduj

Population (2016)
  - Total: 22,216
- Time zone: UTC+3:30 (IRST)

Hiduj District (Persian: بخش هیدوچ) is in Sib and Suran County, Sistan and Baluchestan province, Iran. Its capital is the city of Hiduj.

== History ==
After the 2006 National Census, Hiduj and Sib and Suran Districts were separated from Saravan County in the establishment of Sib and Suran County, which was divided into two districts of two rural districts each, with Suran as its capital.

== Demographics ==
=== Population ===
At the 2006 National Census, the district's population (as a part of Saravan County) was 16,743 in 3,630 households. The following census in 2011 counted 20,011 people in 4,814 households. At the 2016 census, the population of the district was 22,216 in 5,873 households.

=== Administrative divisions ===
Hiduj District Population (Note: As a part of Saravan County at the 2006 census)
Administrative Divisions	2006	2011	2016
Hiduj RD	6,454	7,443	8,779
Kont RD	9,224	11,042	11,763
Hiduj (city)	1,065	1,526	1,674
Total	10,966	10,308	8,674
RD = Rural District
