= Central District (Saravan County) =

District in Sistan and Baluchestan province, Iran

Central District (Saravan County) Persian: بخش مرکزی شهرستان سراوان
- District
- Location within Iran
- Coordinates: 27°36′23″N 62°06′48″E
- Country: Iran
- Province: Sistan and Baluchestan
- County: Saravan
- Capital: Saravan

Population (2016)
  - Total: 117,002
- Time zone: UTC+3:30 (IRST)

The Central District of Saravan County (Persian: بخش مرکزی شهرستان سراوان) is in Sistan and Baluchestan province, Iran. Its capital is the city of Saravan.

== History ==
After the 2006 National Census, the villages of Gosht and Mohammadi were elevated to city status. In 2019, Nahuk Rural District was separated from Jaleq District (Note: Renamed the Central District of Golshan County) to join the Central District.

== Demographics ==
=== Population ===
At the time of the 2006 census, the district's population was 97,055 in 17,549 households. The following census in 2011 counted 114,112 people in 25,459 households. The 2016 census measured the population of the district as 117,002 inhabitants in 30,710 households.

=== Administrative divisions ===
Central District (Saravan County) Population
| Administrative Divisions | 2006 | 2011 | 2016 |
|---|---|---|---|
| Gosht RD | 6,588 | 3,476 | 4,655 |
| Howmeh RD | 31,815 | 40,490 | 41,735 |
| Nahuk RD (Note: Transferred from Jaleq District after the 2016 census) | | | |
| Gosht (city) | | 5,145 | 4,992 |
| Mohammadi (city) | | 5,206 | 5,606 |
| Saravan (city) | 58,652 | 59,795 | 60,014 |
| Total | 97,055 | 114,112 | 117,002 |
RD = Rural District
