= Sib and Suran County =

County in Sistan and Baluchestan province, Iran

Sib and Suran County Persian: شهرستان سیب و سوران
- County
- Location of Sib and Suran County in Sistan and Baluchestan province (center right, pink)

- Location of Sistan and Baluchestan province in Iran
- Coordinates: 27°15′51″N 61°50′59″E
- Country: Iran
- Province: Sistan and Baluchestan
- Capital: Suran
- Districts: Central, Hiduj, Paskuh

Population (2016)
  - Total: 85,095
- Time zone: UTC+3:30 (IRST)

Sib and Suran County (Persian: شهرستان سیب و سوران) is in Sistan and Baluchestan province, Iran. Its capital is the city of Suran.

== History ==
After the 2006 National Census, Hiduj and Sib and Suran Districts were separated from Saravan County in the establishment of Sib and Suran County, which was divided into two districts of two rural districts each, with Suran as its capital.

After the 2016 census, Shandan Rural District was established in the Central District, and Paskuh Rural District was separated from it in the formation of Paskuh District, including the new Sar Sureh Rural District. Additionally, the village of Sib was elevated to the status of a city.

== Demographics ==
=== Population ===
At the time of the 2011 census, the county's population was 73,189 people in 17,445 households. The 2016 census measured the population of the county as 85,095 in 21,665 households.

=== Administrative divisions ===
Sib and Suran County's population history and administrative structure over two consecutive censuses are shown in the following table.

Sib and Suran County Population
Administrative Divisions	2011	2016
Central District	52,668	62,876
Paskuh RD	14,031	16,297
Shandan RD (Note: Established after the 2016 census)		
Sib and Suran RD	28,005	32,999
Sib (city) (Note: Became a city after the 2016 census)		
Suran (city)	10,632	13,580
Hiduj District	20,011	22,216
Hiduj RD	7,443	8,779
Kont RD	11,042	11,763
Hiduj (city)	1,526	1,674
Paskuh District		
Paskuh RD		
Sar Sureh RD		
Total	73,189	85,095
RD = Rural District

== See also ==
Media related to Sib and Suran County at Wikimedia Commons
