= Bam Pasht District =

District in Sistan and Baluchestan province, Iran

Bam Pasht District Persian: بخش بم پشت
- District
- Location within Iran
- Coordinates: 26°51′48″N 62°44′32″E
- Country: Iran
- Province: Sistan and Baluchestan
- County: Saravan
- Capital: Sirkan

Population (2016)
  - Total: 37,906
- Time zone: UTC+3:30 (IRST)

Bam Pasht District (Persian: بخش بم پشت) is in Saravan County, Sistan and Baluchestan province, Iran. Its capital is the city of Sirkan.

== History ==
After the 2016 National Census, Kuhak-e Esfandak Rural District was separated from the district in the formation of Mehregan District.

== Demographics ==
=== Population ===
At the time of the 2006 census, the district's population was 27,221 in 6,228 households. The following census in 2011 counted 32,226 people in 7,547 households. The 2016 census measured the population of the district as 37,906 inhabitants in 9,895 households.

=== Administrative divisions ===
Bam Pasht District Population
Administrative Divisions	2006	2011	2016
Bam Pasht RD	11,029	12,510	14,481
Keshtegan RD	5,578	6,584	8,349
Kuhak-e Esfandak RD (Note: Transferred to Mehregan District after the 2016 census)	9,267	11,633	12,880
Sirkan (city)	1,347	1,499	2,196
Total	27,221	32,226	37,906
RD = Rural District
