= Sib and Suran District =

Former district in Sistan and Baluchestan province, Iran

Sib and Suran District Persian: بخش سیب و سوران
- Former District
- Location within Iran
- Coordinates: 27°22′20″N 61°52′45″E
- Country: Iran
- Province: Sistan and Baluchestan
- County: Saravan
- Capital: Suran

Population (2006)
  - Total: 44,041
- Time zone: UTC+3:30 (IRST)

Sib and Suran District (Persian: بخش سیب و سوران) is a former administrative division of Saravan County, Sistan and Baluchestan province, Iran. Its capital was the city of Suran.

== History ==
After the 2006 National Census, the district was separated from the county in the establishment of Sib and Suran County.

== Demographics ==
=== Population ===
At the time of the 2006 census, the district's population was 44,041 in 9,033 households.

=== Administrative divisions ===
Sib and Suran District Population
Administrative Divisions	2006
Paskuh RD	9,655
Sib and Suran RD	24,420
Suran (city)	9,966
Total	44,041
RD = Rural District
