= Central District (Golshan County) =

District in Sistan and Baluchestan province, Iran

Central District (Golshan County) Persian: بخش مرکزی شهرستان گلشن
- District
- Location within Iran
- Coordinates: 27°46′45″N 62°26′13″E
- Country: Iran
- Province: Sistan and Baluchestan
- County: Golshan
- Capital: Jaleq

Population (2016)
  - Total: 36,351 (Note: As Jaleq District of Saravan County)
- Time zone: UTC+3:30 (IRST)

The Central District of Golshan County (Persian: بخش مرکزی شهرستان گلشن) (Note: Formerly Jaleq District (بخش جالق) of Saravan County) is in Sistan and Baluchestan province, Iran. Its capital is the city of Jaleq.

== History ==
In 2019, Jaleq District (Note: Renamed the Central District of Golshan County) was separated from Saravan County in the establishment of Golshan County and renamed the Central District. The new county was divided into two districts of two rural districts each, with Jaleq as its capital and only city.

== Demographics ==
=== Population ===
At the time of the 2006 census, the district's population was 23,211 in 4,441 households. The following census in 2011 counted 28,584 people in 6,249 households. The 2016 census measured the population of the district as 36,351 inhabitants in 9,685 households.

=== Administrative divisions ===
Central District (Golshan County) (Note: As Jaleq District of Saravan County at the 2006, 2011, and 2016 censuses)
Administrative Divisions	2006	2011	2016
Jaleq RD	1,278	1,123	2,877
Kalleh Gan RD (Note: Transferred to Kalleh Gan District after the 2016 census)	2,933	3,877	6,962
Nahuk RD (Note: Transferred to the Central District of Saravan County after the 2016 census)	5,097	6,038	8,414
Sinokan RD (Note: Established after the 2016 census)			
Jaleq (city)	13,903	17,546	18,098
Total	23,211	28,584	36,351
RD = Rural District
