= Golshan County =

County in Sistan and Baluchestan province, Iran

Golshan County Persian: شهرستان گلشن
- County
- Location of Golshan County in Sistan and Baluchestan province (right, green)

- Location of Sistan and Baluchestan province in Iran
- Coordinates: 27°42′02″N 62°26′13″E
- Country: Iran
- Province: Sistan and Baluchestan
- Capital: Jaleq
- Districts: Central, Kalleh Gan
- Time zone: UTC+3:30 (IRST)

Golshan County (Persian: شهرستان گلشن) is in Sistan and Baluchestan province, Iran. Its capital is the city of Jaleq, whose population at the time of the 2016 National Census was 18,098 in 4,719 households.

== History ==
In 2019, Jaleq District (Note: Renamed the Central District of Golshan County) was separated from Saravan County in the establishment of Golshan County and renamed the Central District. The new county was divided into two districts of two rural districts each, with Jaleq as its capital and only city.

== Demographics ==
=== Administrative divisions ===
Golshan County's administrative structure is shown in the following table.

Golshan County
Administrative Divisions
Central District (Note: Formerly Jaleq District of Saravan County)
Jaleq RD
Sinokan RD
Jaleq (city)
Kalleh Gan District
Kalleh Gan RD
Shand Ashkandan RD
RD = Rural District

== See also ==
Media related to Golshan County at Wikimedia Commons
