= Saravan County =

County in Sistan and Baluchestan province, Iran

Saravan County Persian: شهرستان سراوان
- County
- Location of Saravan County in Sistan and Baluchestan province (right, purple)

- Location of Sistan and Baluchestan province in Iran
- Coordinates: 27°21′53″N 62°27′36″E
- Country: Iran
- Province: Sistan and Baluchestan
- Capital: Saravan
- Districts: Central, Bam Pasht, Mehregan

Population (2016)
  - Total: 191,661
- Time zone: UTC+3:30 (IRST)

Saravan County (Persian: شهرستان سراوان) is in Sistan and Baluchestan province, Iran. Its capital is the city of Saravan.

== History ==
After the 2006 National Census, Hiduj and Sib and Suran Districts were separated from the county in the establishment of Sib and Suran County. Zaboli District was also separated from the county in establishing Zaboli County. (Note: Renamed Mehrestan County) The villages of Gosht and Mohammadi were elevated to city status.

In 2017, Kuhak-e Esfandak Rural District (Note: Renamed Esfandak Rural District) was separated from Bam Pasht District in the formation of Mehregan District, including the new Kuhak Rural District.

In 2019, Nahuk Rural District was separated from Jaleq District (Note: Renamed the Central District of Golshan County) to join the Central District, and Jaleq District was separated from the county in the establishment of Golshan County. In 2021, the village of Esfandak was upgraded to a city.

== Demographics ==
=== Population ===
At the time of the 2006 census, the county's population was 239,950 in 47,753 households. The following census in 2011 counted 175,728 people in 39,415 households. The 2016 census measured the population of the county as 191,661, in 50,524 households.

=== Administrative divisions ===
Saravan County's population history and administrative structure over three consecutive censuses are shown in the following table.

Saravan County Population
Administrative Divisions	2006	2011	2016
Central District	97,055	114,112	117,002
Gosht RD	6,588	3,476	4,655
Howmeh RD	31,815	40,490	41,735
Nahuk RD			
Gosht (city)		5,145	4,992
Mohammadi (city)		5,206	5,606
Saravan (city)	58,652	59,795	60,014
Bam Pasht District	27,221	32,226	37,906
Bam Pasht RD	11,029	12,510	14,481
Keshtegan RD	5,578	6,584	8,349
Kuhak-e Esfandak RD	9,267	11,633	12,880
Sirkan (city)	1,347	1,499	2,196
Hiduj District (Note: Transferred to Sib and Suran County)	16,743		
Hiduj RD	6,454		
Kont RD	9,224		
Hiduj (city)	1,065		
Jaleq District (Note: Transferred to Golshan County and renamed the Central District)	23,211	28,584	36,351
Jaleq RD	1,278	1,123	2,877
Kalleh Gan RD	2,933	3,877	6,962
Nahuk RD (Note: Transferred to the Central District after the 2016 census)	5,097	6,038	8,414
Jaleq (city)	13,903	17,546	18,098
Mehregan District (Note: Established after the 2016 census)			
Esfandak RD (Note: Formerly Kuhak-e Esfandak Rural District)			
Kuhak RD			
Esfandak (city) (Note: Became a city after the 2016 census)			
Sib and Suran District	44,041		
Paskuh RD	9,655		
Sib and Suran RD	24,420		
Suran (city)	9,966		
Zaboli District (Note: Transferred to Zaboli County)	31,679		
Birk RD	6,648		
Zaboli RD	17,359		
Zaboli (city) (Note: Renamed Mehrestan)	7,672		
Total	239,950	175,728	191,661
RD = Rural District

== See also ==
Media related to Saravan County at Wikimedia Commons
