= Dehi, Sistan and Baluchestan =

Village in Sistan and Baluchestan province, Iran

Dehi Persian: دهی
- Village
- Location within Iran
- Coordinates: 26°57′06″N 61°36′05″E
- Country: Iran
- Province: Sistan and Baluchestan
- County: Mehrestan
- District: Central
- Rural District: Dehi

Population (2016)
  - Total: 685
- Time zone: UTC+3:30 (IRST)

Dehi (Persian: دهی) is a village in, and the capital of, Dehi Rural District of the Central District of Mehrestan County, (Note: Formerly Zaboli County) Sistan and Baluchestan province, Iran.

== Demographics ==
=== Population ===
At the time of the 2006 National Census, the village's population was 648 in 146 households, when it was in Zaboli Rural District of the former Zaboli District of Saravan County. The following census in 2011 counted 572 people in 137 households, by which time the district had been separated from the county in the establishment of Zaboli County. (Note: Renamed Mehrestan County) The rural district was transferred to the new Central District. The 2016 census measured the population of the village as 685 people in 162 households.

Dehi was transferred to Dehi Rural District created in the district after the 2016 census.
