= Sukhteh (disambiguation) =

Sukhteh (Persian: سوخته) or its variants may refer to:

== Iran ==
=== Gilan province ===
- Sukhteh Kish, a village in Amlash County
- Sukhteh Kuh, Astaneh-ye Ashrafiyeh, a village in Astaneh-ye Ashrafiyeh County
- Sukhteh Kuh, Lahijan, a village in Lahijan County
- Sukhteh Luleh, a village in Rasht County
- Sukhteh Kosh, a village in Rudsar County

=== Khuzestan province ===
- Sukhteh, a village in Andika County

=== Mazandaran province ===
- Sukhteh Kola, a village in Qaem Shahr County

=== Qazvin province ===
- Sukhteh Chenar, a village in Qazvin County

=== Sistan and Baluchestan province ===
- Sukhteh Gaz, a village in Mehrestan County
- Sukhteh Mok, a village in Saravan County
