= Kahn-e Jan Mohammad =

Village in Sistan and Baluchestan province, Iran

Kahn-e Jan Mohammad Persian: كهن جان محمد
- Village
- Location within Iran
- Coordinates: 27°13′39″N 61°28′55″E
- Country: Iran
- Province: Sistan and Baluchestan
- County: Mehrestan
- District: Birk
- Rural District: Birk

Population (2016)
  - Total: 699
- Time zone: UTC+3:30 (IRST)

Kahn-e Jan Mohammad (Persian: كهن جان محمد) (Note: Also romanized as Kahn-e Jān Moḩammad) is a village in Birk Rural District of Birk District, Mehrestan County, (Note: Formerly Zaboli County) Sistan and Baluchestan province, Iran.

== Demographics ==
=== Population ===
At the time of the 2006 National Census, the village's population was 372 in 74 households, when it was in the former Zaboli District of Saravan County. The following census in 2011 counted 515 people in 123 households, by which time the district had been separated from the county in the establishment of Zaboli County. (Note: Renamed Mehrestan County) The rural district was transferred to the new Central District. The 2016 census measured the population of the village as 699 people in 177 households.

After the census, the rural district was separated from the district in the formation of Birk District.
