= Chad-e Bala =

Village in Sistan and Baluchestan province, Iran

Chad-e Bala Persian: چد بالا
- Village
- Location within Iran
- Coordinates: 27°18′10″N 61°25′27″E
- Country: Iran
- Province: Sistan and Baluchestan
- County: Mehrestan
- District: Birk
- Rural District: Birk-e Sharqi

Population (2016)
  - Total: 522
- Time zone: UTC+3:30 (IRST)

Chad-e Bala (Persian: چد بالا) (Note: Also romanized as Chād-e Bālā; also known as Chad-e Borzī) is a village in, and the capital of, Birk-e Sharqi Rural District of Birk District, Mehrestan County, (Note: Formerly Zaboli County) Sistan and Baluchestan province, Iran.

== Demographics ==
=== Population ===
At the time of the 2006 National Census, the village's population was 396 in 80 households, when it was in Birk Rural District of the former Zaboli District of Saravan County. The following census in 2011 counted 293 people in 64 households, by which time the district had been separated from the county in the establishment of Zaboli County. (Note: Renamed Mehrestan County) The rural district was transferred to the new Central District. The 2016 census measured the population of the village as 522 people in 117 households.

After the census, the rural district was separated from the district in the formation of Birk District, and Chad-e Bala was transferred to Birk-e Sharqi Rural District created in the new district.
