= Regentog =

Village in Sistan and Baluchestan province, Iran

Regentog Persian: رگنتگ
- Village
- Location within Iran
- Coordinates: 27°18′09″N 61°19′48″E
- Country: Iran
- Province: Sistan and Baluchestan
- County: Mehrestan
- District: Birk
- Rural District: Birk

Population (2016)
  - Total: 348
- Time zone: UTC+3:30 (IRST)

Regentog (Persian: رگنتگ) (Note: Also known as Ragantak, Regen Tok, and Regentok) is a village in, and the capital of, Birk Rural District of Birk District, Mehrestan County, (Note: Formerly Zaboli County) Sistan and Baluchestan province, Iran. The previous capital of the rural district was the village of Chahuk.

== Demographics ==
=== Population ===
At the time of the 2006 National Census, the village's population was 470 in 101 households, when it was in the former Zaboli District of Saravan County. The following census in 2011 counted 492 people in 117 households, by which time the district had been separated from the county in the establishment of Zaboli County. (Note: Renamed Mehrestan County) The rural district was transferred to the new Central District. The 2016 census measured the population of the village as 348 people in 86 households.

After the census, the rural district was separated from the district in the formation of Birk District.
