= Chahuk, Mehrestan =

Village in Sistan and Baluchestan province, Iran

Chahuk Persian: چاهوک
- Village
- Location within Iran
- Coordinates: 27°14′47″N 61°26′01″E
- Country: Iran
- Province: Sistan and Baluchestan
- County: Mehrestan
- District: Birk
- Rural District: Birk-e Sharqi

Population (2016)
  - Total: 1,320
- Time zone: UTC+3:30 (IRST)

Chahuk (Persian: چاهوک is a village in Birk-e Sharqi Rural District of Birk District, Mehrestan County, (Note: Formerly Zaboli County) Sistan and Baluchestan province, Iran, serving as capital of the district. It was the capital of Birk Rural District until its capital was transferred to the village of Regentog.

== Demographics ==
=== Population ===
At the time of the 2006 National Census, the village's population was 710 in 167 households, when it was in Birk Rural District of the former Zaboli District of Saravan County. The following census in 2011 counted 948 people in 214 households, by which time the district had been separated from the county in the establishment of Zaboli County. (Note: Renamed Mehrestan County) The rural district was transferred to the new Central District. The 2016 census measured the population of the village as 1,320 people in 311 households. It was the most populous village in its rural district.

After the census, the rural district was separated from the district in the formation of Birk District. Chahuk was transferred to Birk-e Sharqi Rural District created in the district.
