= Kahn-e Rasul Bakhsh =

Kahn-e Rasul Bakhsh كهن رسول بخش
- Village
- Location within Iran
- Coordinates: 27°08′30″N 61°42′18″E
- Country: Iran
- Province: Sistan and Baluchestan
- County: Mehrestan
- Bakhsh: Central
- Rural District: Zaboli

Population (2006)
  - Total: 188
- Time zone: UTC+3:30 (IRST)
  - Summer (DST): UTC+4:30 (IRDT)

Kahn-e Rasul Bakhsh (Persian: كهن رسول بخش, also Romanized as Kahn-e Rasūl Bakhsh; also known as Qanāt-e Rasūl Bakhsh) is a village in Zaboli Rural District, in the Central District of Mehrestan County, Sistan and Baluchestan Province, Iran. At the 2006 census, its population was 188, in 36 families.
