= Hanne =

Hanne is a feminine given name. Notable people with the name include:

- Hanne Blank (born 1969), American historian, writer, editor and public speaker
- Hanne Budtz (1915–2004), Danish politician and lawyer
- Hanne Darboven (1941–2009), German conceptual artist
- Hanne Grete Einarsen (born 1966), Norwegian-Sami artist
- Hanne Gråhns, Swedish footballer
- Hanne Harlem (born 1964), Norwegian politician
- Hanne Haugland (born 1967), Norwegian high jumper
- Hanne Hiob (1923–2009), German actress
- Hanne Hukkelberg (born 1979), Norwegian singer-songwriter
- Hanne Krogh (born 1956), Norwegian singer
- Hanne Liland (born 1969), Norwegian race walker
- Hanne Mestdagh (born 1993), Belgian basketball player
- Hanne N. Rasmussen (born 1950), Danish orchid-fungal symbioses scientist
- Hanne Sigbjørnsen (born 1989), Norwegian blogger
- Hanne Staff (born 1972), Norwegian orienteering athlete
- Hanne Stenvaag (born 1971), Norwegian politician
- Hanne Vandewinkel (born 2004), Belgian tennis player
- Hanne Wolharn (born 1968), German actress

== See also ==
- Hanna (disambiguation)
- Hanni (disambiguation)
- Hanno (disambiguation)
- Hannu (disambiguation)
