= Kahn-e Magar =

Kahn-e Magar كهن مگار
- Village
- Location within Iran
- Coordinates: 27°07′22″N 61°45′47″E
- Country: Iran
- Province: Sistan and Baluchestan
- County: Mehrestan
- Bakhsh: Central
- Rural District: Zaboli

Population (2006)
  - Total: 915
- Time zone: UTC+3:30 (IRST)
  - Summer (DST): UTC+4:30 (IRDT)

Kahn-e Magar (Persian: كهن مگار, also Romanized as Kahn-e Magār; also known as Kahmagār, Kahmgar, Kāmāgār, and Kāmgār) is a village in Zaboli Rural District, in the Central District of Mehrestan County, Sistan and Baluchestan Province, Iran. At the 2006 census, its population was 915, in 215 families.
