= Kahn-e Ali Mohammad =

Kahn-e Ali Mohammad كهن علي محمد
- Village
- Interactive map of Kahn-e Ali Mohammad
- Country: Iran
- Province: Sistan and Baluchestan
- County: Mehrestan
- Bakhsh: Central
- Rural District: Zaboli

Population (2006)
  - Total: 29
- Time zone: UTC+3:30 (IRST)
  - Summer (DST): UTC+4:30 (IRDT)

Kahn-e Ali Mohammad (Persian: كهن علي محمد, also Romanized as Kahn-e ʿAlī Moḩammad) is a village in Zaboli Rural District, in the Central District of Mehrestan County, Sistan and Baluchestan Province, Iran. At the 2006 census, its population was 29, in 5 families.
