= Nuk Ju =

Nuk Ju نوكجو
- Village
- Location within Iran
- Coordinates: 27°12′52″N 61°44′09″E
- Country: Iran
- Province: Sistan and Baluchestan
- County: Mehrestan
- Bakhsh: Central
- Rural District: Zaboli

Population (2006)
  - Total: 239
- Time zone: UTC+3:30 (IRST)
  - Summer (DST): UTC+4:30 (IRDT)

Nuk Ju (Persian: نوكجو, also Romanized as Nūk Jū and Nowkajoo; also known as Nokjū and Nūkdū) is a village in Zaboli Rural District, in the Central District of Mehrestan County, Sistan and Baluchestan Province, Iran. At the 2006 census, its population was 239, in 46 families.
