= Vashkan Chan =

Vashkan Chan وشكان چان
- Village
- Location within Iran
- Coordinates: 26°36′18″N 61°41′40″E
- Country: Iran
- Province: Sistan and Baluchestan
- County: Mehrestan
- Bakhsh: Ashar
- Rural District: Ashar

Population (2006)
  - Total: 813
- Time zone: UTC+3:30 (IRST)
  - Summer (DST): UTC+4:30 (IRDT)

Vashkan Chan (Persian: وشكان چان, also Romanized as Vashkān Chān; also known as Vāshkān Jān, Vashkānjān, and Vashkonchān) is a village in Ashar Rural District, Ashar District, Mehrestan County, Sistan and Baluchestan Province, Iran. At the 2006 census, its population was 813, in 139 families.
