= Kolgi Kesh =

Kolgi Kesh كلگي كش
- Village
- Interactive map of Kolgi Kesh
- Country: Iran
- Province: Sistan and Baluchestan
- County: Mehrestan
- Bakhsh: Ashar
- Rural District: Irafshan

Population (2006)
  - Total: 151
- Time zone: UTC+3:30 (IRST)
  - Summer (DST): UTC+4:30 (IRDT)

Kolgi Kesh (Persian: كلگي كش, also Romanized as Kolgī Kesh) is a village in Irafshan Rural District, Ashar District, Mehrestan County, Sistan and Baluchestan Province, Iran. At the 2006 census, its population was 151, in 29 families.
