= Hut-e Amr =

Hut-e Amr هوت عمر
- Village
- Interactive map of Hut-e Amr
- Country: Iran
- Province: Sistan and Baluchestan
- County: Mehrestan
- Bakhsh: Central
- Rural District: Zaboli

Population (2006)
  - Total: 119
- Time zone: UTC+3:30 (IRST)
  - Summer (DST): UTC+4:30 (IRDT)

Hut-e Amr (Persian: هوت عمر, also Romanized as Hūt-e ʿAmr) is a village in Zaboli Rural District, in the Central District of Mehrestan County, Sistan and Baluchestan Province, Iran. At the 2006 census, its population was 119, in 22 families.
