= Kahn-e Karim Bakhsh =

Kahn-e Karim Bakhsh كهن كريم بخش
- Village
- Location within Iran
- Coordinates: 27°16′30″N 61°22′19″E
- Country: Iran
- Province: Sistan and Baluchestan
- County: Mehrestan
- Bakhsh: Central
- Rural District: Birk

Population (2006)
  - Total: 293
- Time zone: UTC+3:30 (IRST)
  - Summer (DST): UTC+4:30 (IRDT)

Kahn-e Karim Bakhsh (Persian: كهن كريم بخش, also Romanized as Kahn-e Karīm Bakhsh; also known as Kahān-e Karīm Bakhsh) is a village in Birk Rural District, in the Central District of Mehrestan County, Sistan and Baluchestan Province, Iran. At the 2006 census, its population was 293, in 68 families.
