= Barzin Dan =

Barzin Dan برزين دن
- Village
- Interactive map of Barzin Dan
- Country: Iran
- Province: Sistan and Baluchestan
- County: Mehrestan
- Bakhsh: Central
- Rural District: Zaboli

Population (2006)
  - Total: 145
- Time zone: UTC+3:30 (IRST)
  - Summer (DST): UTC+4:30 (IRDT)

Barzin Dan (Persian: برزين دن, also Romanized as Barzīn Dan) is a village in Zaboli Rural District, in the Central District of Mehrestan County, Sistan and Baluchestan Province, Iran. At the 2006 census, its population was 145, in 29 families.
