= Kusiji =

Kusiji كوسيجي
- Village
- Country: Iran
- Province: Sistan and Baluchestan
- County: Mehrestan
- Bakhsh: Central
- Rural District: Birk

Population (2006)
  - Total: 74
- Time zone: UTC+3:30 (IRST)
  - Summer (DST): UTC+4:30 (IRDT)

Kusiji (Persian: كوسيجي, also Romanized as Kūsījī) is a village in Birk Rural District, in the Central District of Mehrestan County, Sistan and Baluchestan Province, Iran. At the 2006 census, its population was 74, in 15 families.
