= Hanni =

Hanni or Hänni may refer to:

== People with the surname ==
- Arto Hanni (born 1973), Finnish volleyball player
- Eric Hänni (1938–2024), Swiss judoka
- Johannes-Andreas Hanni (1957–1982), Estonian serial killer
- Kate Hanni, founder of American consumer advocacy organization FlyersRights.org
- Liia Hänni (born 1946), Estonian astrophysicist and politician
- Paul Hänni (sprinter) (1914–1996), Swiss sprinter
- Sofiane Hanni (born 1990), Algerian professional footballer
- Uku Hänni (born 1943), Estonian astrophysicist and civil servant
- Wilf Hanni, Canadian politician and oil industry consultant

== People with the given name ==
- Hanni Bjartalíð (born 1968), Faroese painter
- Hanni Ehlers (born 1954), German translator
- Hanni Ossott (1946–2002), Venezuelan poet
- Hanni Wenzel (born 1956), Liechtensteiner alpine skier
- Hanni (singer) (born 2004), Vietnamese-Australian singer and dancer, member of K-pop group NewJeans

== See also ==
- Hani (disambiguation)
- Hanna (disambiguation)
- Hanne
- Hanno (disambiguation)
- Hannu (disambiguation)
