= Vashna =

Coordinates: 26°38′N 61°49′E

Vashna وشنا
- Village
- Interactive map of Vashna
- Country: Iran
- Province: Sistan and Baluchestan
- County: Mehrestan
- Bakhsh: Ashar
- Rural District: Irafshan

Population (2006)
  - Total: 136
- Time zone: UTC+3:30 (IRST)
  - Summer (DST): UTC+4:30 (IRDT)

Vashna (Persian: وشنا, also Romanized as Vashnā) is a village in Irafshan Rural District, Ashar District, Mehrestan County, Sistan and Baluchestan Province, Iran. At the 2006 census, its population was 136, in 27 families.
