= Navkan =

Navkan ناوكان
- Village
- Location within Iran
- Coordinates: 26°37′11″N 61°37′28″E
- Country: Iran
- Province: Sistan and Baluchestan
- County: Mehrestan
- Bakhsh: Ashar
- Rural District: Ashar

Population (2006)
  - Total: 142
- Time zone: UTC+3:30 (IRST)
  - Summer (DST): UTC+4:30 (IRDT)

Navkan (Persian: ناوكان, also Romanized as Nāvkān; also known as Nāhūkān) is a village in Ashar Rural District, Ashar District, Mehrestan County, Sistan and Baluchestan Province, Iran. At the 2006 census, its population was 142, in 31 families.
