= Kahn-e Shah Salim =

Kahn-e Shah Salim كهن شاه سليم
- Village
- Location within Iran
- Coordinates: 27°11′28″N 61°45′20″E
- Country: Iran
- Province: Sistan and Baluchestan
- County: Mehrestan
- Bakhsh: Central
- Rural District: Zaboli

Population (2006)
  - Total: 329
- Time zone: UTC+3:30 (IRST)
  - Summer (DST): UTC+4:30 (IRDT)

Kahn-e Shah Salim (Persian: كهن شاه سليم, also Romanized as Kahn-e Shāh Salīm; also known as Chāh Salīm and Shāh Salīm) is a village in Zaboli Rural District, in the Central District of Mehrestan County, Sistan and Baluchestan Province, Iran. At the 2006 census, its population was 329, in 58 families.
