= Sar Kalandan =

Sar Kalandan سركلاندن
- Village
- Interactive map of Sar Kalandan
- Coordinates: 26°42′15″N 61°54′21″E
- Country: Iran
- Province: Sistan and Baluchestan
- County: Mehrestan
- Bakhsh: Ashar
- Rural District: Irafshan

Population (2006)
  - Total: 568
- Time zone: UTC+3:30 (IRST)
  - Summer (DST): UTC+4:30 (IRDT)

Sar Kalandan (Persian: سركلاندن, also Romanized as Sar Kalāndan) is a village in Irafshan Rural District, Ashar District, Mehrestan County, Sistan and Baluchestan Province, Iran. At the 2006 census, its population was 568, in 106 families.
