= Garsaman-e-Bala =

Garsaman-e-Bala گرسمان بالا
- Village
- Location within Iran
- Coordinates: 27°19′53″N 61°23′14″E
- Country: Iran
- Province: Sistan and Baluchestan
- County: Mehrestan
- Bakhsh: Central
- Rural District: Birk

Population (2006)
  - Total: 256
- Time zone: UTC+3:30 (IRST)
  - Summer (DST): UTC+4:30 (IRDT)

Garsaman-e-Bala (Persian: گرسمان بالا, also Romanized as Garsāmān-e-Bālā, Garsaman Bala, and Garsemān-e Bālā) is a village in Birk Rural District, in the Central District of Mehrestan County, Sistan and Baluchestan Province, Iran. At the 2006 census, its population was 256, in 54 families.
