= Siah Yinkan =

Siah Yinkan سياهينكان
- Village
- Country: Iran
- Province: Sistan and Baluchestan
- County: Mehrestan
- Bakhsh: Ashar
- Rural District: Ashar

Population (2006)
  - Total: 13
- Time zone: UTC+3:30 (IRST)
  - Summer (DST): UTC+4:30 (IRDT)

Siah Yinkan (Persian: سياهينكان, also Romanized as Sīāh Yīnkān) is a village in Ashar Rural District, Ashar District, Mehrestan County, Sistan and Baluchestan Province, Iran. At the 2006 census, its population was 13, in 4 families.
