= Garmir-e Khadem =

Garmir-e Khadem گرميرخادم
- Village
- Interactive map of Garmir-e Khadem
- Country: Iran
- Province: Sistan and Baluchestan
- County: Mehrestan
- Bakhsh: Central
- Rural District: Zaboli

Population (2006)
  - Total: 68
- Time zone: UTC+3:30 (IRST)
  - Summer (DST): UTC+4:30 (IRDT)

Garmir-e Khadem (Persian: گرميرخادم, also Romanized as Garmīr-e Khādem) is a village in Zaboli Rural District, in the Central District of Mehrestan County, Sistan and Baluchestan Province, Iran. At the 2006 census, its population was 68, in 15 families.
