= Kahn-e Hoseyn-e Pain =

Kahn-e Hoseyn-e Pain كهن حسين پايين
- Village
- Location within Iran
- Coordinates: 27°08′06″N 61°34′06″E
- Country: Iran
- Province: Sistan and Baluchestan
- County: Mehrestan
- Bakhsh: Central
- Rural District: Zaboli

Population (2006)
  - Total: 265
- Time zone: UTC+3:30 (IRST)
  - Summer (DST): UTC+4:30 (IRDT)

Kahn-e Hoseyn-e Pain (Persian: كهن حسين پايين, also Romanized as Kahn-e Ḩoseyn-e Pā’īn; also known as Kahn-e Ḩoseyn and Kahn-e Ḩoseynābād) is a village in Zaboli Rural District, in the Central District of Mehrestan County, Sistan and Baluchestan Province, Iran. At the 2006 census, its population was 265, in 57 families.
