= Gazauz =

Gazauz گزااوز
- Village
- Location within Iran
- Coordinates: 26°42′17″N 61°53′42″E
- Country: Iran
- Province: Sistan and Baluchestan
- County: Mehrestan
- Bakhsh: Ashar
- Rural District: Irafshan

Population (2006)
  - Total: 395
- Time zone: UTC+3:30 (IRST)
  - Summer (DST): UTC+4:30 (IRDT)

Gazauz (Persian: گزااوز, also Romanized as Gazā’ūz; also known as Gazāvar) is a village in Irafshan Rural District, Ashar District, Mehrestan County, Sistan and Baluchestan Province, Iran. At the 2006 census, its population was 395, in 75 families.
