= Qaderabad, Mehrestan =

Village in Sistan and Baluchestan province, Iran

Qaderabad Persian: قادرآباد
- Village
- Location within Iran
- Coordinates: 27°08′59″N 61°34′51″E
- Country: Iran
- Province: Sistan and Baluchestan
- County: Mehrestan
- District: Central
- Rural District: Zaboli

Population (2016)
  - Total: 2,018
- Time zone: UTC+3:30 (IRST)

Qaderabad (Persian: قادرآباد) is a village in Zaboli Rural District of the Central District of Mehrestan County, (Note: Formerly Zaboli County) Sistan and Baluchestan province, Iran.

== Demographics ==
=== Population ===
At the time of the 2006 National Census, the village's population was 1,305 in 280 households, when it was in the former Zaboli District of Saravan County. The following census in 2011 counted 1,675 people in 434 households, by which time the district had been separated from the county in the establishment of Zaboli County. (Note: Renamed Mehrestan County) The rural district was transferred to the new Central District. The 2016 census measured the population of the village as 2,018 people in 539 households. It was the most populous village in its rural district.
