= Pireh Chah =

Pireh Chah پيره چاه
- Village
- Interactive map of Pireh Chah
- Country: Iran
- Province: Sistan and Baluchestan
- County: Mehrestan
- Bakhsh: Central
- Rural District: Zaboli

Population (2006)
  - Total: 135
- Time zone: UTC+3:30 (IRST)
  - Summer (DST): UTC+4:30 (IRDT)

Pireh Chah (Persian: پيره چاه, also Romanized as Pīreh Chāh) is a village in Zaboli Rural District, in the Central District of Mehrestan County, Sistan and Baluchestan Province, Iran. At the 2006 census, its population was 135, in 30 families.
