= Gitani =

Gitani گيتاني
- Village
- Location within Iran
- Coordinates: 27°29′00″N 61°22′00″E
- Country: Iran
- Province: Sistan and Baluchestan
- County: Mehrestan
- Bakhsh: Central
- Rural District: Birk

Population (2006)
  - Total: 101
- Time zone: UTC+3:30 (IRST)
  - Summer (DST): UTC+4:30 (IRDT)

Gitani (Persian: گيتاني, also Romanized as Gītānī) is a village in Birk Rural District, in the Central District of Mehrestan County, Sistan and Baluchestan Province, Iran. At the 2006 census, its population was 101, in 22 families.
