= Kaluyi =

Kaluyi كلويي
- Village
- Interactive map of Kaluyi
- Country: Iran
- Province: Sistan and Baluchestan
- County: Mehrestan
- Bakhsh: Ashar
- Rural District: Irafshan

Population (2006)
  - Total: 389
- Time zone: UTC+3:30 (IRST)
  - Summer (DST): UTC+4:30 (IRDT)

Kaluyi (Persian: كلويي, also Romanized as Kalūyī) is a village in Irafshan Rural District, Ashar District, Mehrestan County, Sistan and Baluchestan Province, Iran. At the 2006 census, its population was 389, in 86 families.
