= Siah Ettefaq-e Pain =

Siah Ettefaq-e Pain سياه اتفاق پايين
- Village
- Location within Iran
- Coordinates: 27°14′53″N 61°24′00″E
- Country: Iran
- Province: Sistan and Baluchestan
- County: Mehrestan
- Bakhsh: Central
- Rural District: Birk

Population (2006)
  - Total: 333
- Time zone: UTC+3:30 (IRST)
  - Summer (DST): UTC+4:30 (IRDT)

Siah Ettefaq-e Pain (Persian: سياه اتفاق پايين, also Romanized as Sīāh Ettefāq-e Pā’īn; also known as Sīāh Tefāq) is a village in Birk Rural District, in the Central District of Mehrestan County, Sistan and Baluchestan Province, Iran. At the 2006 census, its population was 333 in 73 families.
