= Bolandan =

Bolandan بلندان
- Village
- Location within Iran
- Coordinates: 26°54′21″N 61°40′12″E
- Country: Iran
- Province: Sistan and Baluchestan
- County: Mehrestan
- Bakhsh: Central
- Rural District: Zaboli

Population (2006)
  - Total: 200
- Time zone: UTC+3:30 (IRST)
  - Summer (DST): UTC+4:30 (IRDT)

Bolandan (Persian: بلندان, also Romanized as Bolandān) is a village in Zaboli Rural District, in the Central District of Mehrestan County, Sistan and Baluchestan Province, Iran. At the 2006 census, its population was 200, in 43 families.
