= Gundan =

Gundan گوندان
- Village
- Location within Iran
- Coordinates: 26°56′28″N 61°47′58″E
- Country: Iran
- Province: Sistan and Baluchestan
- County: Mehrestan
- Bakhsh: Central
- Rural District: Zaboli

Population (2006)
  - Total: 91
- Time zone: UTC+3:30 (IRST)
  - Summer (DST): UTC+4:30 (IRDT)

Gundan (Persian: گوندان, also Romanized as Gūndān; also known as Gūhandān) is a village in Zaboli Rural District, in the Central District of Mehrestan County, Sistan and Baluchestan Province, Iran. At the 2006 census, its population was 91, in 22 families.
