= Kahn-e Seyyed Mohammad Bakhti =

Kahn-e Seyyed Mohammad Bakhti كهن سيدمحمد بختي
- Village
- Country: Iran
- Province: Sistan and Baluchestan
- County: Mehrestan
- Bakhsh: Central
- Rural District: Birk

Population (2006)
  - Total: 455
- Time zone: UTC+3:30 (IRST)
  - Summer (DST): UTC+4:30 (IRDT)

Kahn-e Seyyed Mohammad Bakhti (Persian: كهن سيدمحمد بختي, also Romanized as Kahn-e Seyyed Moḩammad Bakhtī) is a village in Birk Rural District, in the Central District of Mehrestan County, Sistan and Baluchestan Province, Iran. At the 2006 census, its population was 455, in 92 families.
