= Katinkan-e Bala =

Katinkan-e Bala كتينكان بالا
- Village
- Location within Iran
- Coordinates: 27°09′23″N 61°33′23″E
- Country: Iran
- Province: Sistan and Baluchestan
- County: Mehrestan
- Bakhsh: Central
- Rural District: Zaboli

Population (2006)
  - Total: 55
- Time zone: UTC+3:30 (IRST)
  - Summer (DST): UTC+4:30 (IRDT)

Katinkan-e Bala (Persian: كتينكان بالا, also Romanized as Katīnkān-e Bālā; also known as Kātīhīkān, Katihkān, Katīkān, Katīkan-e Bālā, and Katīnkān) is a village in Zaboli Rural District, in the Central District of Mehrestan County, Sistan and Baluchestan Province, Iran. At the 2006 census, its population was 55, in 13 families.
