= Bakhti-ye Bala =

Bakhti-ye Bala بختي بالا
- Village
- Location within Iran
- Coordinates: 27°24′31″N 61°18′22″E
- Country: Iran
- Province: Sistan and Baluchestan
- County: Mehrestan
- Bakhsh: Central
- Rural District: Birk

Population (2006)
  - Total: 81
- Time zone: UTC+3:30 (IRST)
  - Summer (DST): UTC+4:30 (IRDT)

Bakhti-ye Bala (Persian: بختي بالا, also Romanized as Bakhtī-ye Bālā; also known as Dar Moḩammad, Bakhtī, and Qanāt-e Seyyed Moḩammad) is a village in Birk Rural District, in the Central District of Mehrestan County, Sistan and Baluchestan Province, Iran. At the time of the 2006 census, its population was 81, across 17 families.
