= Kashgai, Iran =

Kashgai كاشگائي
- Village
- Location within Iran
- Coordinates: 27°03′22″N 61°23′29″E
- Country: Iran
- Province: Sistan and Baluchestan
- County: Mehrestan
- Bakhsh: Central
- Rural District: Zaboli

Population (2006)
  - Total: 261
- Time zone: UTC+3:30 (IRST)
  - Summer (DST): UTC+4:30 (IRDT)

Kashgai (Persian: كاشگائي, also Romanized as Kāshgā’ī; also known as Kāshīkāhī) is a village in Zaboli Rural District, in the Central District of Mehrestan County, Sistan and Baluchestan Province, Iran. At the 2006 census, its population was 261, in 60 families.
