= Birk-e Sharqi Rural District =

Rural district in Sistan and Baluchestan province, Iran

Birk-e Sharqi Rural District Persian: دهستان بیرک شرقی
- Rural District
- Location within Iran
- Coordinates: 27°24′27″N 61°18′09″E
- Country: Iran
- Province: Sistan and Baluchestan
- County: Mehrestan
- District: Birk
- Capital: Chad-e Bala
- Time zone: UTC+3:30 (IRST)

Birk-e Sharqi Rural District (Persian: دهستان بیرک شرقی) is in Birk District of Mehrestan County, (Note: Formerly Zaboli County) Sistan and Baluchestan province, Iran. Its capital is the village of Chad-e Bala, whose population at the time of the 2016 National Census was 522 people in 117 households.

== History ==
After the 2006 census, Zaboli District was separated from Saravan County, and Ashar District from Sarbaz County, in the establishment of Zaboli County. (Note: Renamed Mehrestan County) After the 2016 census, Birk Rural District was separated from the Central District in the formation of Birk District, and Birk-e Sharqi Rural District was created in the new district.
