= Murt Anjir =

Murt Anjir مورت انجير
- Village
- Location within Iran
- Coordinates: 26°44′05″N 61°42′21″E
- Country: Iran
- Province: Sistan and Baluchestan
- County: Mehrestan
- Bakhsh: Ashar
- Rural District: Ashar

Population (2006)
  - Total: 20
- Time zone: UTC+3:30 (IRST)
  - Summer (DST): UTC+4:30 (IRDT)

Murt Anjir (Persian: مورت انجير, also Romanized as Mūrt Ānjīr; also known as Mūrt Hanjar) is a village in Ashar Rural District, Ashar District, Mehrestan County, Sistan and Baluchestan Province, Iran. At the 2006 census, its population was 20, in 6 families.
