= Sang-e Lak =

Sang-e Lak سنگلك
- Village
- Location within Iran
- Coordinates: 27°12′11″N 61°31′00″E
- Country: Iran
- Province: Sistan and Baluchestan
- County: Mehrestan
- Bakhsh: Central
- Rural District: Zaboli

Population (2006)
  - Total: 198
- Time zone: UTC+3:30 (IRST)
  - Summer (DST): UTC+4:30 (IRDT)

Sang-e Lak (Persian: سنگلك) is a village in Zaboli Rural District, in the Central District of Mehrestan County, Sistan and Baluchestan Province, Iran. As of the 2006 census, its population was 198, in 42 families.
