= Sandok =

Sandok ساندك
- Village
- Location within Iran
- Coordinates: 27°15′00″N 61°21′00″E
- Country: Iran
- Province: Sistan and Baluchestan
- County: Mehrestan
- Bakhsh: Central
- Rural District: Birk

Population (2006)
  - Total: 207
- Time zone: UTC+3:30 (IRST)
  - Summer (DST): UTC+4:30 (IRDT)

Sandok (Persian: ساندك, also Romanized as Sāndok) is a village in Birk Rural District, in the Central District of Mehrestan County, Sistan and Baluchestan Province, Iran. At the 2006 census, its population was 207, in 42 families.
