= Kahn-e Emam Bibi Surap =

Kahn-e Emam Bibi Surap كهن امام بي بي سوراپ
- Village
- Interactive map of Kahn-e Emam Bibi Surap
- Country: Iran
- Province: Sistan and Baluchestan
- County: Mehrestan
- Bakhsh: Central
- Rural District: Zaboli

Population (2006)
  - Total: 32
- Time zone: UTC+3:30 (IRST)
  - Summer (DST): UTC+4:30 (IRDT)

Kahn-e Emam Bibi Surap (Persian: كهن امام بي بي سوراپ, also Romanized as Kahn-e Emām Bībī Sūrāp) is a village in Zaboli Rural District, in the Central District of Mehrestan County, Sistan and Baluchestan Province, Iran. At the 2006 census, its population was 32, in 7 families.
