= Chorpan Shib =

Chorpan Shib چرپان شيب
- Village
- Interactive map of Chorpan Shib
- Country: Iran
- Province: Sistan and Baluchestan
- County: Mehrestan
- Bakhsh: Ashar
- Rural District: Ashar

Population (2006)
  - Total: 56
- Time zone: UTC+3:30 (IRST)
  - Summer (DST): UTC+4:30 (IRDT)

Chorpan Shib (Persian: چرپان شيب, also Romanized as Chorpān Shīb) is a village in Ashar Rural District, Ashar District, Mehrestan County, Sistan and Baluchestan Province, Iran. At the 2006 census, its population was 56, in 13 families.
