= Shanbeh Bar Gah =

Shanbeh Bar Gah شنبه بر گاه
- Village
- Interactive map of Shanbeh Bar Gah
- Country: Iran
- Province: Sistan and Baluchestan
- County: Mehrestan
- Bakhsh: Ashar
- Rural District: Ashar

Population (2006)
  - Total: 20
- Time zone: UTC+3:30 (IRST)
  - Summer (DST): UTC+4:30 (IRDT)

Shanbeh Bar Gah (Persian: شنبه بر گاه, also Romanized as Shanbeh Bar Gāh) is a village in Ashar Rural District, Ashar District, Mehrestan County, Sistan and Baluchestan Province, Iran. At the 2006 census, its population was 20, in 4 families.
