= Eshkastegan =

Eshkastegan اشكستگان
- Village
- Location within Iran
- Coordinates: 26°40′07″N 61°45′41″E
- Country: Iran
- Province: Sistan and Baluchestan
- County: Mehrestan
- Bakhsh: Ashar
- Rural District: Ashar

Population (2006)
  - Total: 203
- Time zone: UTC+3:30 (IRST)
  - Summer (DST): UTC+4:30 (IRDT)

Eshkastegan (Persian: اشكستگان, also Romanized as Eshkastegān) is a village in Ashar Rural District, Ashar District, Mehrestan County, Sistan and Baluchestan Province, Iran. At the 2006 census, its population was 203, in 42 families.
