= Chah Lashkaran-e Bala =

Chah Lashkaran-e Bala چاه لشكران بالا
- Village
- Interactive map of Chah Lashkaran-e Bala
- Country: Iran
- Province: Sistan and Baluchestan
- County: Mehrestan
- Bakhsh: Central
- Rural District: Birk

Population (2006)
  - Total: 88
- Time zone: UTC+3:30 (IRST)
  - Summer (DST): UTC+4:30 (IRDT)

Chah Lashkaran-e Bala (Persian: چاه لشكران بالا, also Romanized as Chāh Lashkarān-e Bālā) is a village in Birk Rural District, in the Central District of Mehrestan County, Sistan and Baluchestan Province, Iran. At the 2006 census, its population was 88, in 12 families.
