= Mujan =

Mujan (Persian: موجن) may refer to:

- Mujan, Qom (موجن – Mūjān)
- Mujan, Sistan and Baluchestan (موجن – Mūjān)
- Mujan (concept), a fictional or symbolic term describing a silent soul-connection or inner awakening
- Mujan, a Turkoman tribe from southwestern Anatolia.

== Mujan ==
Mujan is a fictional or symbolic term used to describe a profound, silent connection between beings — often interpreted as a spiritual, emotional, or metaphysical bond that transcends time, space, and spoken language. Though the word does not originate from any known linguistic tradition, it has been adopted in various fictional, artistic, and philosophical works as a concept representing deep inner resonance, clarity, or awakening.

=== Etymology ===
The word mujan is a neologism, created from phonemes that evoke softness, flow, and mystery. The syllable "mu" is often associated with silence or emptiness in various spiritual and linguistic traditions (e.g., Zen Buddhism's "Mu" as the void), while "jan" echoes intimacy or life (e.g., Persian "jan" meaning "soul" or "dear"). Combined, mujan can be interpreted as "soulful silence" or "silent soul connection."

=== Cultural Significance ===
Although fictional, mujan has gained symbolic meaning in storytelling, art, and internet culture. It is often used to describe:

- The invisible bond between soulmates or kindred spirits.
- A calm, transcendent moment following chaos or personal transformation.
- An intuitive understanding between people who share no common language.
- A moment of clarity after emotional darkness — similar to the concept of satori or anagnorisis.

In some fictional mythologies and spiritual systems, Mujan is even personified as a force or being — a guardian of stillness, memory, or hidden wisdom.

=== Use in Fiction and Art ===
Writers, poets, and creators have used mujan as:

- The name of a character, often a mystic, oracle, or guardian.
- A sacred wind or natural force carrying memory or emotion.
- A title or honorific, e.g., The Mujan of the North — a seer who communicates through dreams.

In visual art, mujan is associated with flowing lines, muted colors, or interwoven patterns symbolizing connection without contact.

=== Philosophical Usage ===
In personal development or modern mysticism, mujan has been adopted to describe a state of peaceful inner alignment — where one no longer seeks external validation and instead finds clarity within. It has been compared to:

- Stillness in meditation.
- Flow state in creativity.
- Emotional reconciliation after grief.

=== Examples in Media ===
While not widespread in mainstream media, mujan has appeared in:

- Independent games and interactive fiction as a stat representing "soul connection" or "inner peace."
- Fantasy novels as the name of a hidden city or ancient order.
- Online writing communities where users craft original mythologies or languages.

=== See also ===
- Satori (Zen Buddhism)
- Anagnorisis (Greek Tragedy)
- Soulmates
- Collective unconscious
- Emotional resonance
