= Irafshan =

Village in Sistan and Baluchestan province, Iran

Irafshan Persian: ايرافشان
- Village
- Location within Iran
- Coordinates: 26°41′23″N 61°55′46″E
- Country: Iran
- Province: Sistan and Baluchestan
- County: Mehrestan
- District: Afshar
- Rural District: Irafshan

Population (2016)
  - Total: 789
- Time zone: UTC+3:30 (IRST)

Irafshan (Persian: ايرافشان) (Note: Also romanized as Īrafshān; also known as Eskandar, Qal‘eyh-ye Īrafshān, Sekandar, and Sīkandar) is a village in, and the capital of, Irafshan Rural District of Ashar District, Mehrestan County, (Note: Formerly Zaboli County) Sistan and Baluchestan province, Iran.

== Demographics ==
=== Population ===
At the time of the 2006 National Census, the village's population was 602 in 106 households, when it was in Sarbaz County. The following census in 2011 counted 738 people in 178 households, by which time the district had been separated from the county in the establishment of Zaboli County. (Note: Renamed Mehrestan County) The 2016 census measured the population of the village as 789 people in 209 households. It was the most populous village in its rural district.
