= Dehi Rural District =

Rural district in Sistan and Baluchestan province, Iran

Dehi Rural District Persian: دهستان دهی
- Rural District
- Location within Iran
- Coordinates: 26°55′55″N 61°39′44″E
- Country: Iran
- Province: Sistan and Baluchestan
- County: Mehrestan
- District: Central
- Capital: Dehi
- Time zone: UTC+3:30 (IRST)

Dehi Rural District (Persian: دهستان دهی) is in the Central District of Mehrestan County, (Note: Formerly Zaboli County) Sistan and Baluchestan province, Iran. Its capital is the village of Dehi, whose population at the time of the 2016 National Census was 685 people in 162 households.

== History ==
After the 2006 census, Zaboli District was separated from Saravan County, and Ashar District from Sarbaz County, in the establishment of Zaboli County. (Note: Renamed Mehrestan County) Dehi Rural District was created in the Central District after the 2016 census.
