= Chah Lashkaran =

Chah Lashkaran (Persian: چاه لشكران) may refer to:

- Chah Lashkaran-e Bala
- Chah Lashkaran-e Pain
