= Haniya =

Haniya may refer to:

== People ==
- Haniya Aslam (1978–2024) – Pakistani musician and guitarist, member of Zeb and Haniya.
- Haniya Nafisa (born 2003) – Indian actress and singer.
- Akram Haniyah – Palestinian journalist.
- Yutaka Haniya (1909–1997) – Japanese writer and literary critic.
- Ismail Haniyeh (c. 1962–2024) – Palestinian political leader; surname also transliterated as Haniya or Haniyah.
- Hania Aamir – Pakistani actress and model.
- Hania Rani – Polish pianist, composer, and singer.
- Hania (given name) – feminine given name.

== Music ==
- Zeb and Haniya – Pakistani musical duo consisting of Zeb Bangash and Haniya Aslam.

== Mythology ==
- Haniyasu-hiko and Haniyasu-hime – Japanese gods of earth, clay, and pottery.

== Places ==
- Haniya, Libya – town in Cyrenaica, Libya.
- Haniyan – village in Sistan and Baluchestan Province, Iran.
- Hania, Crete – alternative transliteration related to Chania, Greece.

== Related names and terms ==
- Haniyeh – Arabic surname and transliteration variant.
- Haniyah – another transliteration variant.
- Hania – related feminine given name and disambiguation page.
- Hani – name and disambiguation page.
- Hanna (name) – feminine given name.

== See also ==
- Hania
- Hani
- Haniyeh
- Haniyah
- Chania
- Hannibal
- Hannibal Lecter
