= Gulag (disambiguation) =

The Gulag was the government agency that administered the penal labor camps of the Soviet Union. It may also be used as a general word for a prison, especially those used to hold political prisoners.

Gulag may also refer to:

- Gulag (1985 film), a film by Roger Young starring David Keith
- Gulag, Iran, a village in South Khorasan Province, Iran
- Gulag: A History, a book by Anne Applebaum
- The Gulag Archipelago, a book by Aleksandr Solzhenitsyn

== See also ==
- Goolag (disambiguation)
- Kulak (disambiguation)
