= Hizabad-e Bala =

Hizabad-e Bala هيزابادبالا
- Village
- Location within Iran
- Coordinates: 27°06′28″N 61°35′45″E
- Country: Iran
- Province: Sistan and Baluchestan
- County: Mehrestan
- Bakhsh: Central
- Rural District: Zaboli

Population (2006)
  - Total: 453
- Time zone: UTC+3:30 (IRST)
  - Summer (DST): UTC+4:30 (IRDT)

Hizabad-e Bala (Persian: هيزابادبالا, also Romanized as Hīzābād-e Bālā) is a village in Zaboli Rural District, in the Central District of Mehrestan County, Sistan and Baluchestan Province, Iran. At the 2006 census, its population was 453, in 110 families.
