= Mujan, Sistan and Baluchestan =

Mujan موجن
- Village
- Country: Iran
- Province: Sistan and Baluchestan
- County: Mehrestan
- Bakhsh: Ashar
- Rural District: Ashar

Population (2006)
  - Total: 52
- Time zone: UTC+3:30 (IRST)
  - Summer (DST): UTC+4:30 (IRDT)

Mujan (Persian: موجن, also Romanized as Mūjan) is a village in Ashar Rural District, Ashar District, Mehrestan County, Sistan and Baluchestan Province, Iran. At the 2006 census, its population was 52, in 9 families.
