= Chah Lashkaran-e Pain =

Chah Lashkaran-e Pain چاه لشكران پايين
- Village
- Interactive map of Chah Lashkaran-e Pain
- Country: Iran
- Province: Sistan and Baluchestan
- County: Mehrestan
- Bakhsh: Central
- Rural District: Birk

Population (2006)
  - Total: 156
- Time zone: UTC+3:30 (IRST)
  - Summer (DST): UTC+4:30 (IRDT)

Chah Lashkaran-e Pain (Persian: چاه لشكران پايين, also Romanized as Chāh Lashkarān-e Pā’īn) is a village in Birk Rural District, in the Central District of Mehrestan County, Sistan and Baluchestan Province, Iran. At the 2006 census, its population was 156, in 38 families.
