= Sukhteh Gaz =

Sukhteh Gaz سوخته گز
- Village
- Location within Iran
- Coordinates: 26°41′31″N 61°42′25″E
- Country: Iran
- Province: Sistan and Baluchestan
- County: Mehrestan
- Bakhsh: Ashar
- Rural District: Ashar

Population (2006)
  - Total: 215
- Time zone: UTC+3:30 (IRST)
  - Summer (DST): UTC+4:30 (IRDT)

Sukhteh Gaz (Persian: سوخته گز, also Romanized as Sūkhteh Gaz; also known as Tang-e Posht) is a village in Ashar Rural District, Ashar District, Mehrestan County, Sistan and Baluchestan Province, Iran. At the 2006 census, its population was 215, in 47 families.
