= Hizabad-e Pain =

Hizabad-e Pain هيزابادپايين
- Village
- Location within Iran
- Coordinates: 27°06′34″N 61°37′01″E
- Country: Iran
- Province: Sistan and Baluchestan
- County: Mehrestan
- Bakhsh: Central
- Rural District: Zaboli

Population (2006)
  - Total: 205
- Time zone: UTC+3:30 (IRST)
  - Summer (DST): UTC+4:30 (IRDT)

Hizabad-e Pain (Persian: هيزابادپايين, also Romanized as Hīzābād-e Pā’īn and Hiz Abad Pa’in) is a village in Zaboli Rural District, in the Central District of Mehrestan County, Sistan and Baluchestan Province, Iran. At the 2006 census, its population was 205, in 47 families.
