= Hansan, Iran =

Hansan حنسان
- Village
- Country: Iran
- Province: Sistan and Baluchestan
- County: Mehrestan
- Bakhsh: Ashar
- Rural District: Irafshan

Population (2006)
  - Total: 24
- Time zone: UTC+3:30 (IRST)
  - Summer (DST): UTC+4:30 (IRDT)

Hansan (Persian: حنسان, also Romanized as Ḩansān) is a village in Iran. It is located in the Irafshan Rural District, Ashar District, Mehrestan County, Sistan and Baluchestan Province. As of the 2006 census, its population was 24.
