= Kanigan, Iran =

Kanigan كاني گان
- Village
- Location within Iran
- Coordinates: 27°11′13″N 61°28′05″E
- Country: Iran
- Province: Sistan and Baluchestan
- County: Mehrestan
- Bakhsh: Central
- Rural District: Birk

Population (2006)
  - Total: 20
- Time zone: UTC+3:30 (IRST)
  - Summer (DST): UTC+4:30 (IRDT)

Kanigan (Persian: كاني گان, also Romanized as Kānīgān) is a village in Birk Rural District, in the Central District of Mehrestan County, Sistan and Baluchestan Province, Iran. At the 2006 census, its population was 20, in 4 families.
