= Chad-e Pain =

Chad-e Pain چدپائين
- Village
- Location within Iran
- Coordinates: 27°17′19″N 61°25′46″E
- Country: Iran
- Province: Sistan and Baluchestan
- County: Mehrestan
- Bakhsh: Central
- Rural District: Birk

Population (2006)
  - Total: 58
- Time zone: UTC+3:30 (IRST)
  - Summer (DST): UTC+4:30 (IRDT)

Chad-e Pain (Persian: چدپائين, also Romanized as Chād-e Pā’īn and Chad-e Pā’īn; also known as Chādūk) is a village in Birk Rural District, in the Central District of Mehrestan County, Sistan and Baluchestan Province, Iran. At the 2006 census, its population was 58, in 13 families.
