= Multan, Iran =

Multan مولتان
- Village
- Location within Iran
- Coordinates: 27°00′57″N 61°50′21″E
- Country: Iran
- Province: Sistan and Baluchestan
- County: Mehrestan
- Bakhsh: Central
- Rural District: Zaboli

Population (2006)
  - Total: 867
- Time zone: UTC+3:30 (IRST)
  - Summer (DST): UTC+4:30 (IRDT)

Multan (Persian: مولتان, also Romanized as Mūltān) is a village in Zaboli Rural District, in the Central District of Mehrestan County, Sistan and Baluchestan Province, Iran. At the 2006 census, its population was 867, in 181 families.
