= Hizabad =

Hizabad or Hiz Abad (Persian: هيزاباد) may refer to:

- Hizabad-e Bala, a village in Zaboli Rural District, in the Central District of Mehrestan County, Sistan and Baluchestan Province, Iran
- Hizabad-e Pain, a village in Zaboli Rural District, in the Central District of Mehrestan County, Sistan and Baluchestan Province, Iran
