= Kulak, Sistan and Baluchestan =

Kulak كولك
- Village
- Interactive map of Kulak
- Country: Iran
- Province: Sistan and Baluchestan
- County: Mehrestan
- Bakhsh: Ashar
- Rural District: Irafshan

Population (2006)
  - Total: 238
- Time zone: UTC+3:30 (IRST)
  - Summer (DST): UTC+4:30 (IRDT)

Kulak (Persian: كولك, also Romanized as Kūlak) is a village in Irafshan Rural District, Ashar District, Mehrestan County, Sistan and Baluchestan Province, Iran. At the 2006 census, its population was 238, in 38 families.
