= Nadan (disambiguation) =

Nadan is a 2013 Indian Malayalam-language drama film.

Nadan may also refer to:

- Nadan, Iran, a village in Sistan and Baluchestan Province
- Nadan (Nadar subcaste), a group from the regions south of the Thamirabarani River in India
- Nadan v The King, a 1926 ruling of the Judicial Committee of the Privy Council in Canada
- Nadan Vidošević (born 1960), Croatian politician, businessman and entrepreneur
- Jambulinga Nadan (fl. 1926–1927), brigand of the southern Madras Presidency in British India
- Nanjil Nadan (born 1947), writer from Tamil Nadu, India

== See also ==
- Bab Nadan, a village in Kerman Province, Iran
- Nadaniyaan, an Indian TV sitcom
- Nadaan (disambiguation)
