= Chad (disambiguation) =

Chad is a landlocked country in Africa.

Chad may also refer to:

== People ==
- Chad (name), an English given name and surname
- Chad baronets, a 1791–1855 baronetcy for George Chad

== Places ==
- Chaddesden or Chadd, a suburb of Derby, England
- Lake Chad, a body of water in Africa
- Lake Chad (Antarctica)

== Media ==
- Chad (newspaper), a regional newspaper for Mansfield and Ashfield, England
- Chad (TV series), an American television show

== Other uses ==
- Chad (chess variant), a chess variant by Christian Freeling
- Chad (graffiti) or Mr Chad, a British graffiti character
- Chad (paper), a particle created when a hole is punched through a piece of paper or card stock
- Chad (slang), a slang term for a young, affluent, or alpha male
- ChAd, a simian adenovirus used to develop ChAdOx1

== See also ==
- Chad-e Bala or Upper Chad, a village in Iran
- Chad-e Pain or Lower Chad, a village in Iran
- CHADS2 score, a clinical prediction rule for the risk of stroke
