= George Chad (disambiguation) =

George Chad was an English diplomat.

George Chad may also refer to:

- Sir George Chad, Baronet of the Chad baronets

== See also ==
- Chad George, mixed martial artist
- Chad (disambiguation)
