= Hano =

Hano or HANO may refer to:

- Hano, Arizona
- Hanö, an island off Listerlandet peninsula, western Blekinge, Sweden
- Hanö Bay, is a sandy bay, stretching from Listerlandet
- Arizona Tewa, a Tewa Pueblo group
- "Hano" (song), a song in the 2001 Eurovision Song Contest by Nino Pršeš
- Housing Authority of New Orleans
- Hanunoo script (ISO 15924 code)
- Raga language, spoken in Vanuatu

== People ==
- Arnold Hano (1922–2021), American editor, novelist, biographer and journalist
- Felicia Hano (born 1998), American artistic gymnast
- Horst Hano (born 1937), German journalist
- Johannes Hano (born 1963), German journalist
- Kazushi Hano (born 1991), Japanese rugby sevens player
- Miklós Hanó (1957–2023), Hungarian politician
- Younan Hano (born 1982), Iraqi Syriac Catholic archbishop

== See also ==
- Hanno
