= Al Hamamah =

Al Hamamah الحمامة Al Hamama
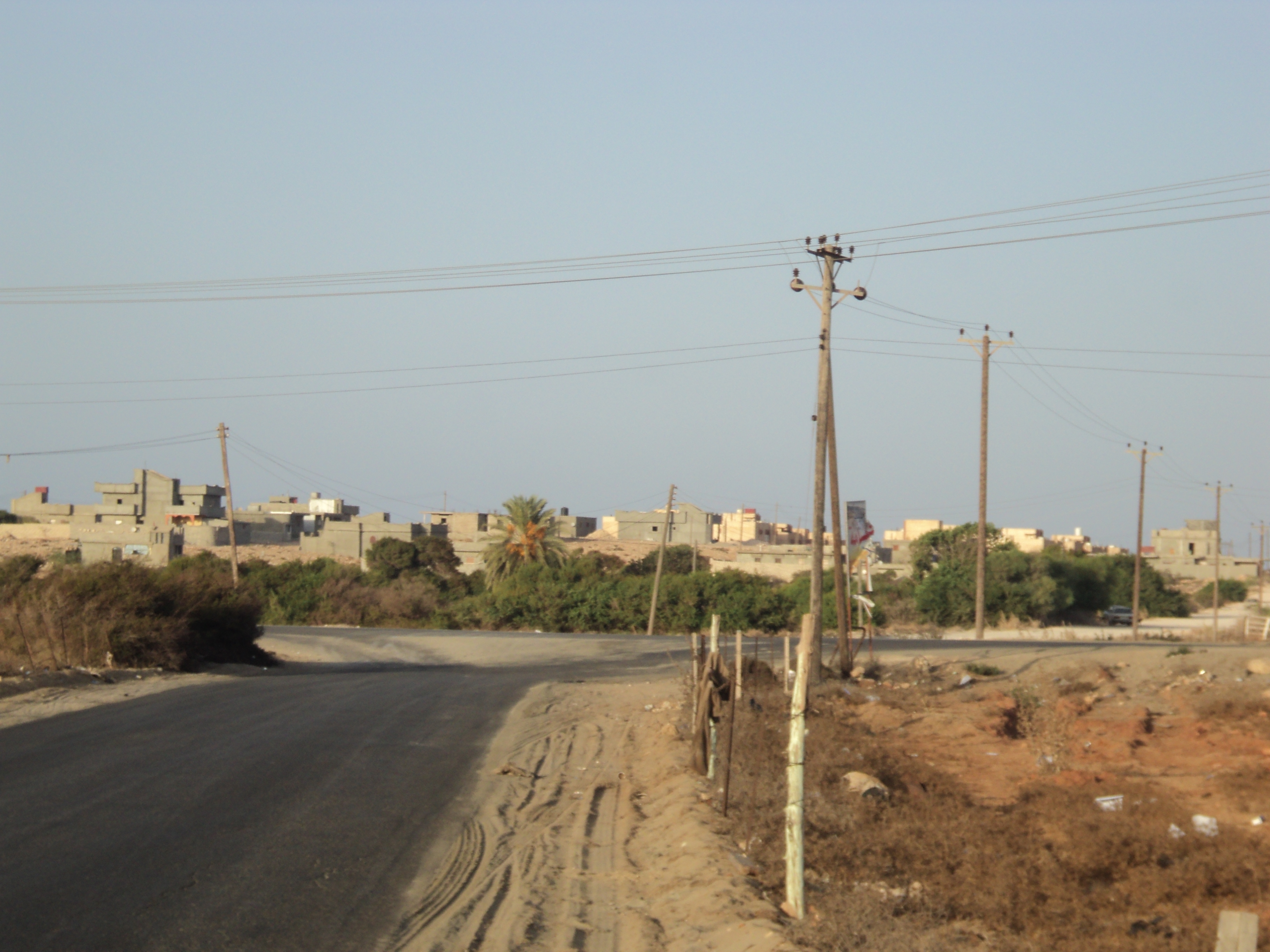

- Location in Libya
- Coordinates: 32°54′52″N 21°37′43″E
- Country: Libya
- Region: Cyrenaica
- District: Jebel Akhdar
- Time zone: UTC + 2

Al Hamamah (Arabic: الحمامة) is a village on the coast of eastern Libya, some 20 km (12 mi) north of Al Bayda. Roads are connecting it with Al Bayda (to the south) and with Al Haniya to the west. There is an imperfect track between it and Susa (to the east).
