= Hansan =

Hansan may refer to:

== Places ==
- Hansan, Iran, a village in Sistan and Baluchestan Province, Iran
- Hansan Island, Tongyeong, South Korea
  - Battle of Hansan Island
- Hansan, Birbhum, a village in Birbhum district, West Bengal, India
  - Hansan (Vidhan Sabha constituency)
- Hansan-myeon, Seocheon, South Chungcheong province in South Korea

== Film ==
- Hansan (film), a 2022 South Korean film based on Battle of Hansan Island
