= Multani =

Multani may refer to:

== People ==
=== With the surname ===
- Ayn al-Mulk Multani, commander of the Delhi Sultanate in India
- Har Karan Ibn Mathuradas Kamboh Multani, writer during the Mughal Empire

=== Ethnic groups ===
- Multani (caste), an Indian community found in the Gujarat state in India
- Multani Lohar, a Muslim community found in the states of Gujarat and Uttar Pradesh in India

== Places ==
- Something or someone from, or relating to, Multan, a city in Punjab, Pakistan
- Something or someone from, or relating to, Multan Khurd, a town in Punjab, Pakistan
- Multani Caravanserai, caravanserai in Baku, Azerbaijan

== Other uses ==
- 15th Lancers (Cureton's Multanis), cavalry regiment of the British Indian Army
- Multani (raga), a raga, or melodic structure, in South Asian classical music
- Multani Mal Modi College, a university in Patiala, India

== See also ==
- Multan (disambiguation)
- Multani v. Commission scolaire Marguerite‑Bourgeoys, a 2006 decision of the Supreme Court of Canada
