= Uku =

Uku or UKU may refer to:

- Ukko or Uku, god of sky, weather, crops (harvest) and other natural things in Estonian and Finnish mythology
- Uku (given name), Estonian masculine given name
- Uku, the First Beloved Man of a pre-nation Cherokee tribe
- UK Ultraspeed, proposed magnetic-levitation train line between London and Glasgow
- Uku (fish), a fish

== Places ==
- Uku, Angola, town in Angola
- Uku, Nagasaki, town in Kitamatsuura District, Nagasaki, Japan
- Uku, Nepal, village development committee in Darchula District, Mahakali Zone, Nepal
- Uku, Estonia, village in Kadrina Parish, Lääne-Viru County, Estonia

== See also ==
- Uku Pacha, underworld located beneath the Earth's surface in Incan mythology
