= TUD =

TUD can refer to:

- Tud, a village in Iran
- Darmstadt University of Technology (German: Technische Universität Darmstadt)
- Delft University of Technology (Dutch: Technische Universiteit Delft)
- Dresden University of Technology (German: Technische Universität Dresden)
- Technical University of Denmark
- Tobacco use disorder
- Technological University Dublin
- PSA TUD engine, the diesel variant of a family of car engines
