= Kanigan =

Kanigan may refer to:

- Kanigan, Iran, a village in Iran
- Kanigan, Queensland, a locality split between the Fraser Coast Region and the Gympie Region, Queensland, Australia
