= Multan (disambiguation) =

Multan is a city in the Punjab province of Pakistan.

Multan may also refer to:

== Places ==
=== Pakistan ===
- Multan District, a district in Punjab, Pakistan encompassing the city of Multan and surrounding areas
- Multan Division, an administrative division in Punjab
- Multan Cantt, a military cantonment in Multan
- Subah of Multan, a Mughal imperial province in Punjab
- Multan Sun Temple, an ancient Hindu sun temple
- Multan Khurd, a town in Talagang Tehsil, Punjab

=== Iran ===
- Multan, Iran, a village in Sistan and Baluchistan Province, Iran

== Others ==
- Multan Tigers, a cricket team in the Faysal Bank T20 Cup
- RMS Mooltan, ship named after the city of Multan
- Choudhary Multan Singh, Indian politician

== See also ==
- Multani (disambiguation)
- Battle of Multan (disambiguation)
- Siege of Multan (disambiguation)
