= Battle of Multan =

Battle of Multan could refer to these battles in Multan:

- Battle of Multan (1475), between the Delhi and Langah Sultanates
- Battle of Multan (1749), part of the Mughal–Sikh Wars
- Battle of Multan (1766), part of the Mughal–Sikh Wars

== See also ==
- Siege of Multan (disambiguation)
- Multan (disambiguation)
