= Kulak (disambiguation) =

A kulak was a rich Russian peasant near the end of the Russian Empire and in the early Soviet Union.

Kulak or KULAK may also refer to:

== Places ==
- Kulak, Sistan and Baluchestan, a village in Sistan and Baluchestan Province, Iran
- Kulak, Şuhut, village in the Şuhut District, Afyonkarahisar Province, Turkey

== Other uses ==
- Kulak (surname)
- Kulak (DC Comics), an evil sorcerer from DC Comics, and enemy of Spectre
- Katholieke Universiteit Leuven Kulak, a university satellite campus of the KU Leuven
