= Gulak =

Gulak may refer to:

- 23722 Gulak, an asteroid
- Drew Gulak, an American professional wrestler
- Gulak, Khusf County, a village in Khusf County, Iran
- Gulak, Gilan, a village in Siahkal County, Gilan province, Iran
