= Goolag =

Goolag may refer to:

- A nickname for Google

- Cult of the Dead Cow, Goolag campaign

- A PHP application designed to operate Google Desktop Search
- Goolag, Iran, a village in South Khorasan Province, Iran
- The Gulag, the Soviet Union's labor camp government.

== See also ==
- Gulag (disambiguation)
