= Birk District =

District in Sistan and Baluchestan province, Iran

Birk District Persian: بخش بیرک
- District
- Location within Iran
- Coordinates: 27°19′16″N 61°16′45″E
- Country: Iran
- Province: Sistan and Baluchestan
- County: Mehrestan
- Capital: Chahuk
- Time zone: UTC+3:30 (IRST)

Birk District (Persian: بخش بیرک) is in Mehrestan County, (Note: Formerly Zaboli County) Sistan and Baluchestan province, Iran. Its capital is the village of Chahuk, whose population at the time of the 2016 National Census was 1,320 people in 311 households.

== History ==
After the 2006 census, Zaboli District was separated from Saravan County, and Ashar District from Sarbaz County, in the establishment of Zaboli County, (Note: Renamed Mehrestan County) which was divided into two districts of two rural districts each, with Zaboli (Note: Renamed Mehrestan) as its capital and only city at the time.

After the 2016 census, Birk Rural District was separated from the Central District in the formation of Birk District.

== Demographics ==
=== Administrative divisions ===
Birk District
Administrative Divisions
Birk Rural District
Birk-e Sharqi Rural District
RD = Rural District
