= Nadaan =

Nadaan (lit. 'Naive') may refer to:

- Nadaan (1943 film), an Indian Hindi-language film
- Nadaan (1951 film), an Indian Hindi-language film by Hira Singh
- Nadaan (1971 film), an Indian Hindi-language drama film by Deven Verma, starring Asha Parekh and Madan Puri
- Nadaan (TV series), a 2024 Pakistani television miniseries directed by Mehreen Jabbar
- Naadam, a traditional Mongolian festival

== See also ==
- Nadan (disambiguation)
- Dil-E-Nadaan (1953 film), a 1953 Indian Hindi-language film by Abdur Rashid Kardar
- Dil-e-Nadaan, a 1982 Indian Hindi-language film by C. V. Sridhar
- Nadaniyaan, an Indian Hindi-language TV sitcom
- Nadaaniyan, a 2025 Indian Hindi-language romantic comedy film
