= Uku (given name) =

Male given name

- Gender: Male
- Language: Estonian

Origin
- Region of origin: Estonia

Uku is an Estonian masculine given name.

People named Uku include:

- Uku Hänni (born 1943), civil servant
- Uku Jürjendal (born 1989), kickboxer
- Uku Masing (1909–1985), philosopher, translator, theologist and folklorist
- Uku Suviste (born 1982), singer
