= Siege of Multan =

Siege of Multan may refer to these military sieges of Multan:

- Siege of Multan (1246), by the Mongol Empire
- Alauddin Khalji's conquest of Multan (1296–1297), by the Delhi Sultanate under Sultan Alauddin Khalji
- Siege of Multan (1398), part of the Timurid invasion of India
- Siege of Multan (1526-1528), part of the Arghun–Langah War
- Siege of Multan (1528), Babur annexes Langah dynasty
- Siege of Multan (1772), Sikh capture of Multan from the Durrani Empire, part of the Afghan–Sikh Wars
- Siege of Multan (1780), by the Durrani Empire from Sikh, part of the Afghan–Sikh Wars
- Siege of Multan (1810), Sikh capture of Multan, part of the Afghan–Sikh Wars
- Siege of Multan (1818), Sikh capture of Multan from the Afghans, part of the Afghan–Sikh Wars
- Siege of Multan (1848–1849), between British East India Company and the Sikh Empire, part of the Second Anglo-Sikh War

== See also ==
- Battle of Multan (disambiguation)
- Multan (disambiguation)
