= Hannu (given name) =

Hannu (from Hannes, a diminutive of Johannes) is a Finnish first name. Notable people with the name include:

- Hannu Aravirta (born 1953), Finnish ice hockey player and an ice hockey coach
- Hannu Haarala (born 1981), Finnish footballer
- Hannu Kaislama (born 1956), Finnish boxer
- Hannu Kamppuri (born 1957), former professional ice hockey goaltender
- Hannu Kapanen (born 1951), former Finnish ice hockey player
- Hannu Kivioja (born 1963), Finnish actor
- Hannu Manninen (born 1978), Finnish Nordic combined athlete
- Hannu Mikkola (1942–2021), retired world champion rally driver
- Hannu Patronen (born 1984), Finnish footballer
- Hannu Rajaniemi (born 1978), Finnish sci-fi author
- Hannu Salama (born 1936), Finnish author
- Hannu Siitonen (born 1949), Finnish athlete
- Hannu Taipale (born 1940), former Finnish cross-country skier
- Hannu Takkula (born 1963), Finnish politician
- Hannu Tihinen (born 1976), Finnish footballer
- Hannu Toivonen (born 1984), Finnish ice hockey goaltender
- Hannu Touru (born 1952), experienced football manager
- Hannu Virta (born 1963), retired Finnish professional ice hockey defenceman
- Hannu Vitanen, fictional Finnish character from the webcomic A Redtail's dream.

== See also ==
- Hannu, ancient Egyptian explorer
- Hanna (disambiguation)
- Hanne
- Hanni (disambiguation)
- Hanno (disambiguation)
