= Hani =

Hani may refer to:

== People ==
- Hani (name)
- Hani (singer), a South Korean singer and member of EXID
- Hani (producer), a record producer and remixer from New York City
- Hani people, an ethnic group of China and Vietnam

== Places ==
- Hani, an island in Iceland, part of the Vestmannaeyjar islands
- Hani, Turkey, a district of Diyarbakır Province
- Hani, Ghana, a town in Tain District, Bono Region; see Bono state

== Other uses ==
- Hani (god), a minor god of the Babylonians and Akkadians
- Hani language, the language of many Hani people
- Hani (sandwich), a sandwich from the Detroit Metro area
- Hani, an alien race in The Chanur novels of C. J. Cherryh
- Hani, ISO 15924 code for the Chinese script
- "Hani?", the Turkish entry in the Eurovision Song Contest 1982

== See also ==
- Hanni (disambiguation)
