= Ashar, Iran =

City in Sistan and Baluchestan province, Iran

Ashar Persian: اشار
- City
- Location within Iran
- Coordinates: 26°40′52″N 61°39′54″E
- Country: Iran
- Province: Sistan and Baluchestan
- County: Mehrestan
- District: Ashar

Population (2016)
  - Total: 3,786
- Time zone: UTC+3:30 (IRST)

Ashar (Persian: اشار) (Note: Also romanized as Āshār; also known as Ashor and Ashur)) is a city in, and the capital of Ashar District of Mehrestan County, (Note: Formerly Zaboli County) Sistan and Baluchestan province, Iran. It also serves as the administrative center for Ashar Rural District.

== Demographics ==
=== Population ===
At the time of the 2006 National Census, Ashar's population was 2,676 in 529 households, when it was a village in Ashar Rural District of Sarbaz County. The following census in 2011 counted 3,817 people in 831 households, by which time the district had been separated from the county in the establishment of Zaboli County. (Note: Renamed Mehrestan County) The 2016 census measured the population of the village as 3,786 people in 927 households. It was the most populous village in its rural district.

After the census, Ashar was elevated to the status of a city.
