= Haniya, Libya =

Haniya المسمارية
- Town
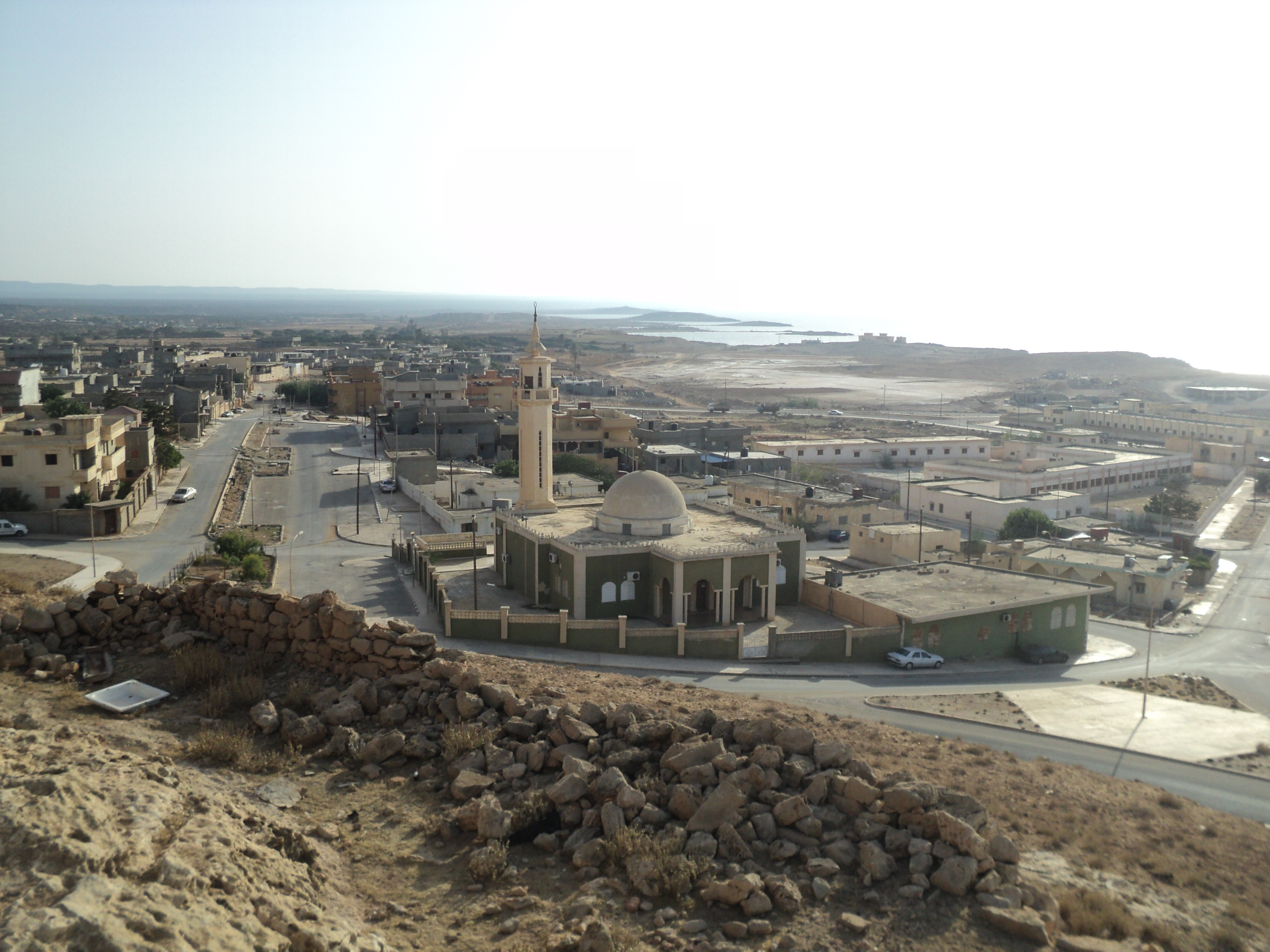

- Location in Libya
- Coordinates: 32°50′28″N 21°31′15″E
- Country: Libya
- Region: Cyrenaica
- District: Jebel el-Akhdar

Population (2006)
  - Total: 2,949
- Time zone: UTC + 2

Haniya, or Al Haniyah, is a town in the District of Jebel el-Akhdar in north-eastern Libya.

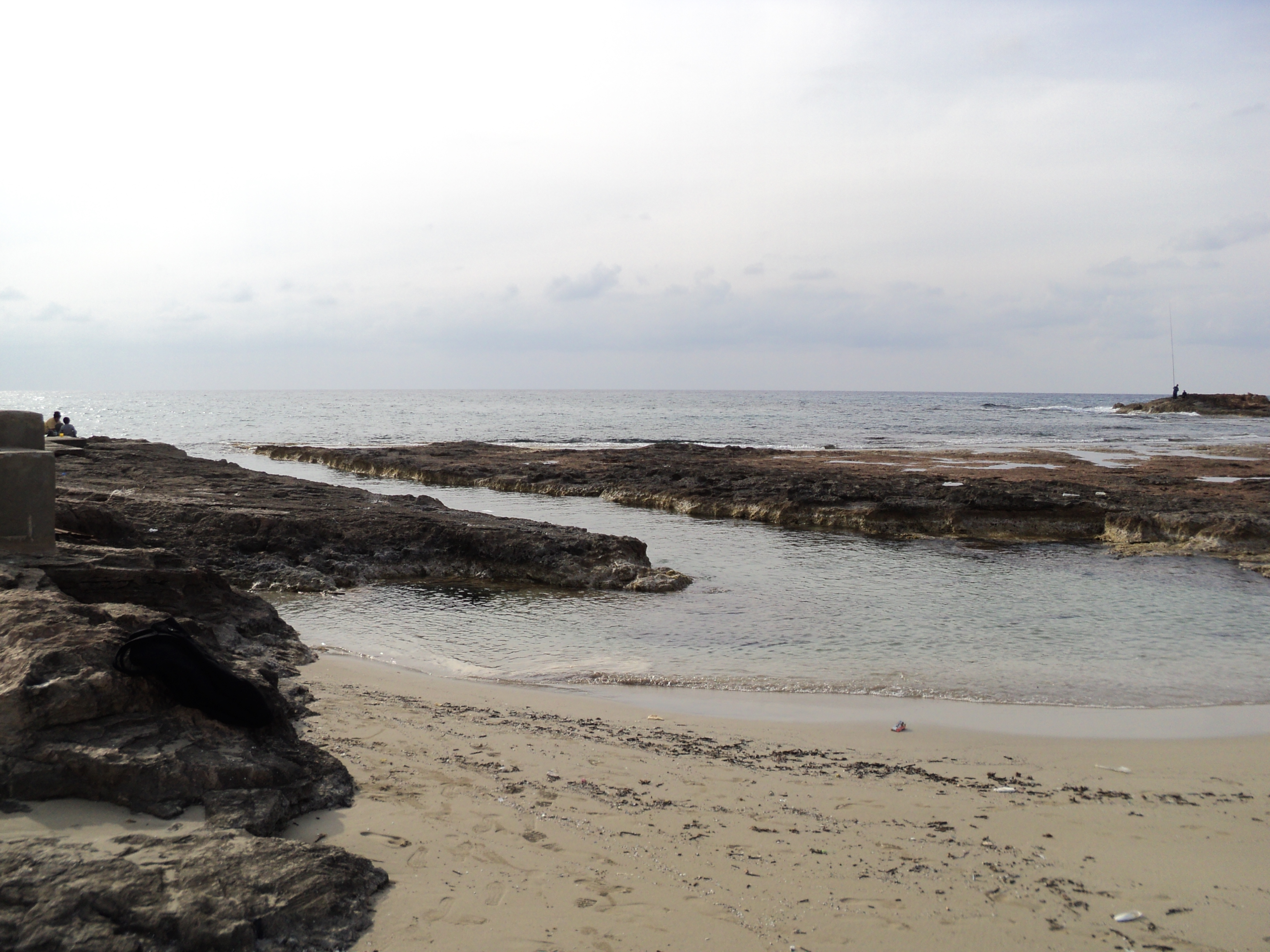
A beach at Al Haniya.

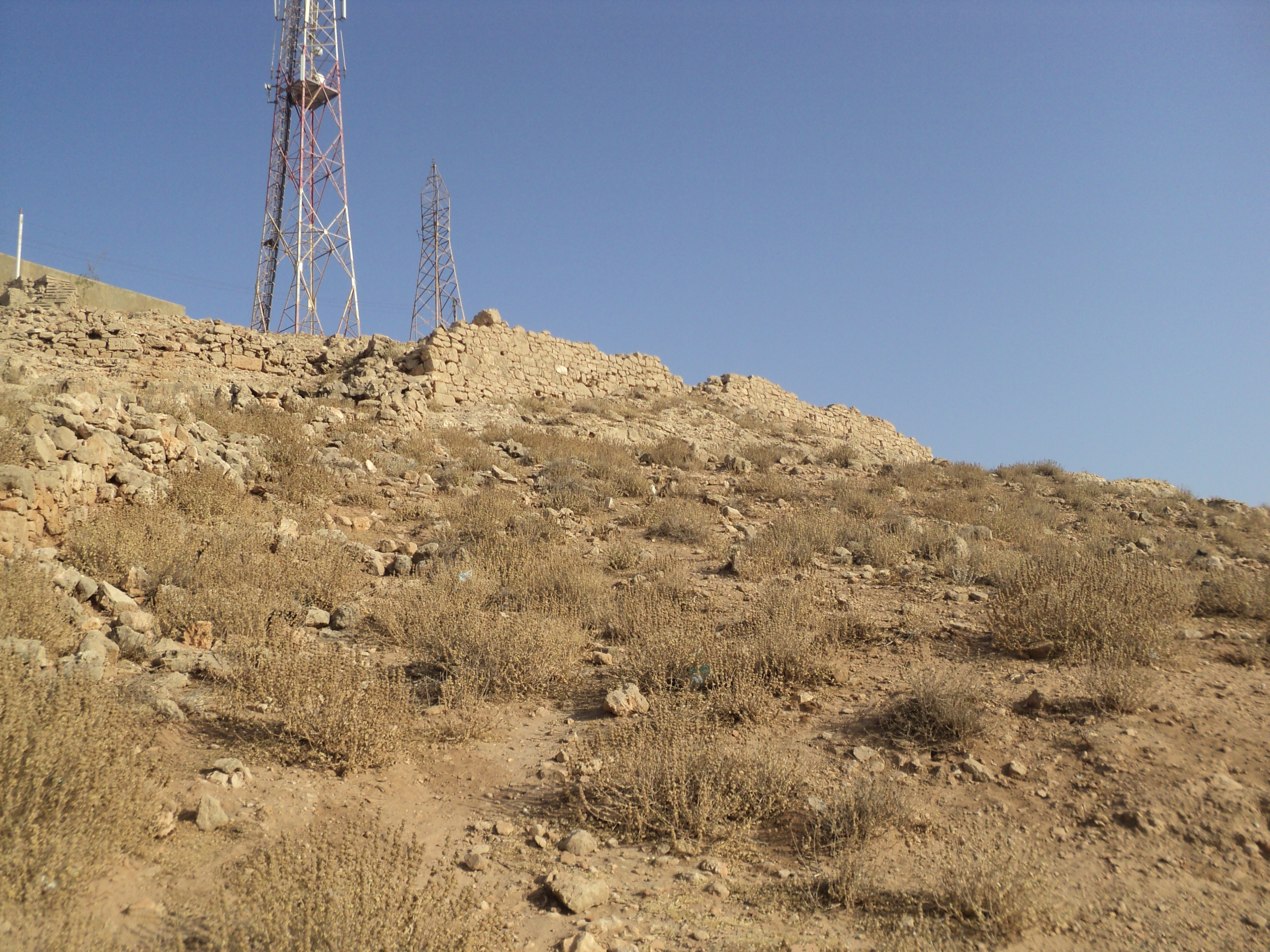
Ruins in Al Haniya
