= Mehrestan =

City in Sistan and Baluchestan province, Iran

Mehrestan Persian: مهرستان
- City
- Location within Iran
- Coordinates: 27°07′42″N 61°40′20″E
- Country: Iran
- Province: Sistan and Baluchestan
- County: Mehrestan
- District: Central

Population (2016)
  - Total: 12,245
- Time zone: UTC+3:30 (IRST)

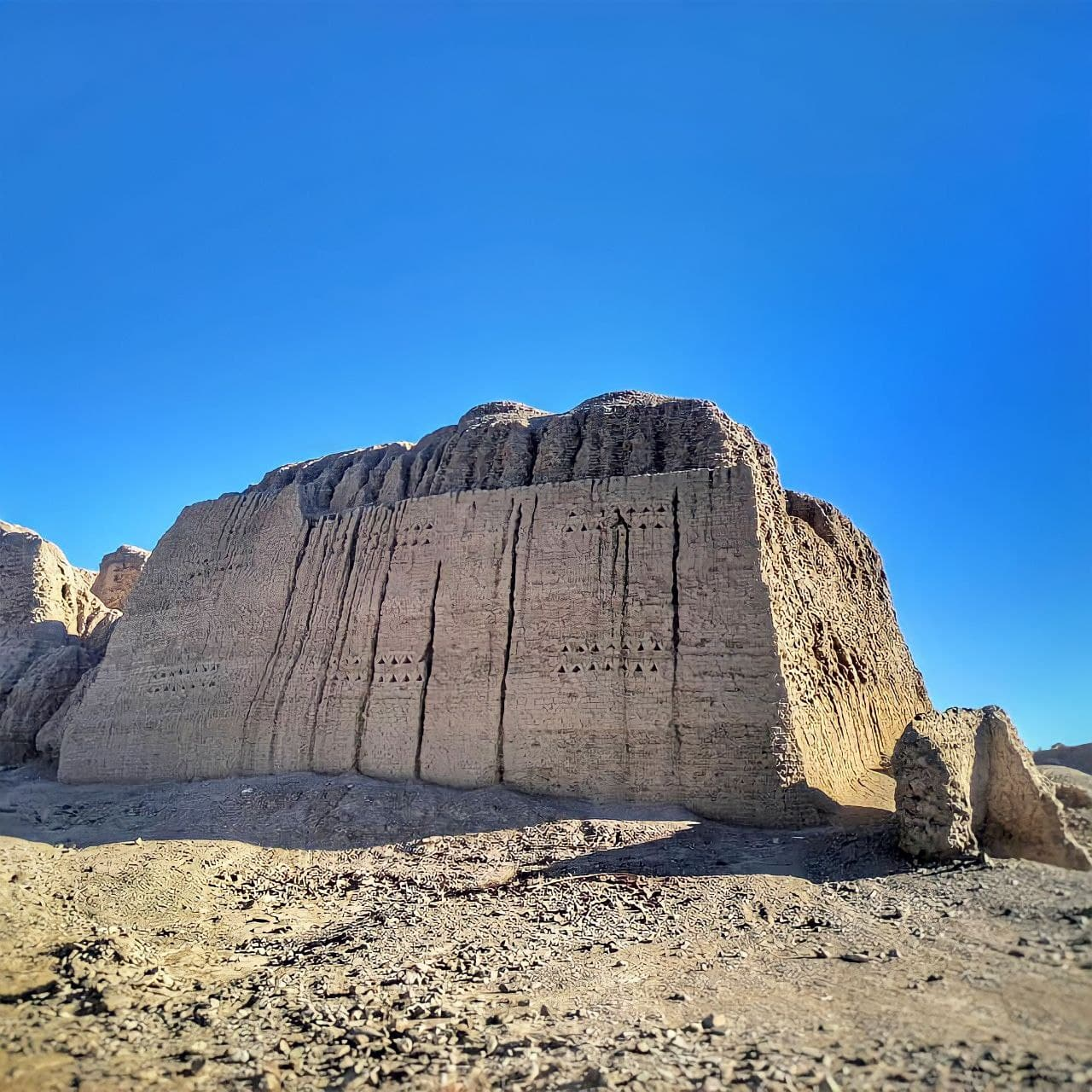
Mehrestan Castle

Mehrestan (Persian: مهرستان) (Note: Formerly Zaboli (زابلي), also romanized as Zābolī; also known as Qal‘eh-ye Zābolī (English: Fort Zaboli); formerly Magas) is a city in the Central District of Mehrestan County, (Note: Formerly Zaboli County) Sistan and Baluchestan province, Iran, serving as capital of both the county and the district. It is also the administrative center for Zaboli Rural District.

== Demographics ==
=== Population ===
At the time of the 2006 National Census, the city's population was 7,672 in 1,560 households, when it was capital of the former Zaboli District of Saravan County. The following census in 2011 counted 10,112 people in 2,171 households, by which time the district had been separated from the county in the establishment of Zaboli County. (Note: Renamed Mehrestan County) Mehrestan was transferred to the new Central District as the county's capital. The 2016 census measured the population of the city as 12,245 people in 2,969 households.
