= Kulak (surname) =

Kulak is a surname. Notable people with the surname include:

- Aleksey Kulak, KGB Colonel
- Anastasiya Kulak, Belarusian handballer
- Brett Kulak (born 1994), Canadian professional ice hockey player
- Stu Kulak (born 1963), Canadian professional ice hockey player
- Dariusz Kulak, drummer of the Polish band Alians

== See also ==
- Koulak
