= Miklós Hanó =

Hungarian politician (1957–2023)

Member of the National Assembly
- In office 14 May 2010 – 5 May 2014
- In office 18 June 1998 – 14 May 2002

Personal details
- Born: 6 February 1957 Békéscsaba, Hungary
- Died: 3 September 2023 (aged 66) Békéscsaba, Hungary
- Party: Fidesz (from 2009)
- Other political affiliations: FKGP (1993–2001); MKPP (from 2001); KPE-KPSZ
- Children: 2
- Profession: politician

Miklós Hanó (6 February 1957 – 3 September 2023) was a Hungarian politician who was a member of the National Assembly (MP) from Békés County Regional List from 2010 to 2014. He also served as Member of Parliament between 1998 and 2002.

== Early life and career ==
Miklós Hanó was born in Békéscsaba, Hungary on 6 February 1957. He graduated from Vocational Secondary School of Food Industry in Szeged. He took his state examination in the College of Food Industry in 1978. He worked as manager of the Körös-Food Ltd. for five years. He was the Chief Engineer of Production at the Húsker Company in Békéscsaba.

Hanó joined the Independent Smallholders, Agrarian Workers and Civic Party (FKGP) in 1993. He served as chairman of the party's Békéscsaba branch from 1993 to 2001. He was also a member of the MAGOSZ. He was a representative in the Békéscsaba Assembly since 1994. He also served as head of the FKGP in Békés County between 1994 and 1998. He left the party in 2001 when the FKGP collapsed and the coalition broke up with the Fidesz (led by PM Viktor Orbán). Hanó was a founding member and chairman of the Hungarian Smallholders and Civic Party (MKPP) since 2001. He served as Deputy Chairman of the Parliamentary Committee on Agriculture between 16 October 2001 and 14 May 2002. The MKPP became supporter of the Fidesz.

Hanó was a member of the Self-defense Movement of Hungarian Farmers and Consumers (MAGFÖM) since 2003. He was a deputy mayor of Békéscsaba from 2006 until his death. He became a member of the Fidesz in 2009. Beside that, he was a leading member of the Fidesz-ally Smallholders' Civil Alliance (KPE-KPSZ). During the 2010 parliamentary elections, he became MP again after eight years from Békés County Regional List. He was a member of the Committee on Agriculture. He ran as candidate of Fidesz for the mayoral seat of Békéscsaba during the 2014 local elections, however lost to independent politician Péter Szarvas.

== Personal life and death ==
Hanó was married and had two children. He died on 3 September 2023, at the age of 66.
