= Hanne Wolharn =

German actress (born 1968)

Hanne Bernadine Wolharn (born November 4, 1968, in Rheda-Wiedenbrück, West Germany) is a German actress.

She plays Senta Lemke on the German soap opera Gute Zeiten, schlechte Zeiten from October 10, 2000, to March 15, 2007. Wolharn is going to leave the show because the RTL television network thinks that she and Klaus-Dieter Klebsch (who plays her dating partner Hannes Bachmann) are too old. This decision shocked many fans in January 2007.
