= Bab Nadan =

Bab Nadan باب ندان
- Village
- Location within Iran
- Coordinates: 30°56′10″N 56°43′48″E
- Country: Iran
- Province: Kerman
- County: Zarand
- Bakhsh: Central
- Rural District: Jorjafak

Population (2006)
  - Total: 47
- Time zone: UTC+3:30 (IRST)
  - Summer (DST): UTC+4:30 (IRDT)

Bab Nadan (Persian: باب ندان, also Romanized as Bāb Nadān; also known as Dar-e Nedū, Darnadū’īyeh, and Dar Nedū) is a village in Jorjafak Rural District, in the Central District of Zarand County, Kerman Province, Iran. At the 2006 census, its population was 47, in 12 families.
