= Sukhteh Kosh =

Sukhteh Kash سوخته كش
- Village
- Location within Iran
- Coordinates: 36°46′21″N 50°12′59″E
- Country: Iran
- Province: Gilan
- County: Rudsar
- Bakhsh: Rahimabad
- Rural District: Shuil

Population (2006)
  - Total: 44
- Time zone: UTC+3:30 (IRST)
  - Summer (DST): UTC+4:30 (IRDT)

Sukhteh Kosh (Persian: سوخته كش, also Romanized as Sūkhteh Kosh) is a village in Shuil Rural District, Rahimabad District, Rudsar County, Gilan Province, Iran. At the 2006 census, its population was 44, in 13 families.
