= Hani (sandwich) =

Sandwich from Detroit

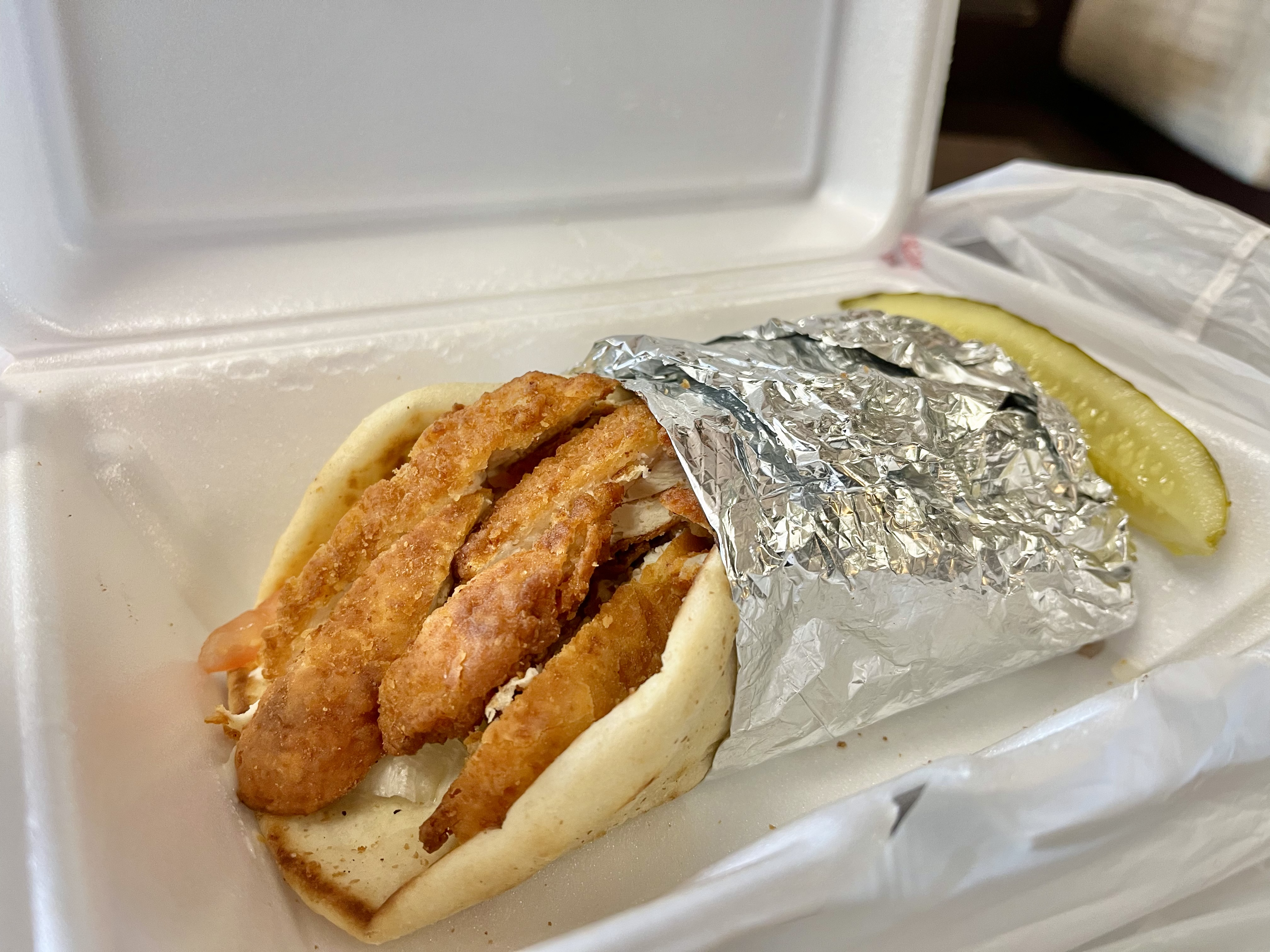
- Chicken finger pita wrap
- Alternative names: Chicken finger pita wrap
- Type: Sandwich
- Course: Main dish
- Place of origin: United States
- Region or state: Detroit
- Created by: Hani
- Main ingredients: fried chicken, lettuce, tomatoes, cheese, mayonnaise, pita bread
- Variations: numerous

The Hani or chicken finger pita wrap is a sandwich from Detroit made from fried chicken, lettuce, tomatoes, cheese, and mayonnaise, all wrapped in pita bread. The cheese is usually a combination of Swiss and cheddar. It is often served with a side of ranch dressing.

It was invented in 1985 by a line cook named Hani who worked at the National Coney Island at Mack Avenue and Seven Mile Road in Detroit. The Hani may have started as a staff meal where the cook would prepare it for his co-workers, but later it was added to the menu. Initially, it was offered as a special at that location of National Coney Island but then it was incorporated in the menus at other locations. It eventually spread to other restaurants in the area. Although the Coney Island hot dog has a longstanding popularity locally, the Hani grew in popularity to rival it at National Coney Island. In May 2023, National Coney Island launched a spin-off restaurant called Pop's Hani Shop dedicated to the sandwich located in Royal Oak, Michigan.

National Coney Island even trademarked the name in response to various establishments serving the dish and calling it the Hani. Consequently, it can be found in other menus in the region as a "chicken finger pita wrap". It has a reputation as a late-night food favored among younger people. However, as of October 2023, outside of Metro Detroit, the dish is relatively unfamiliar.
