= Sukhteh Kola =

Sukhteh Kola سوخته كلا
- Village
- Location within Iran
- Coordinates: 36°26′02″N 52°49′34″E
- Country: Iran
- Province: Mazandaran
- County: Qaem Shahr
- Bakhsh: Central
- Rural District: Balatajan

Population (2006)
  - Total: 586
- Time zone: UTC+3:30 (IRST)
  - Summer (DST): UTC+4:30 (IRDT)

Sukhteh Kola (Persian: سوخته كلا, also Romanized as Sūkhteh Kolā) is a village in Balatajan Rural District, in the Central District of Qaem Shahr County, Mazandaran Province, Iran. At the 2006 census, its population was 586, in 153 families.
