= Mujan (tribe) =

Turkoman tribe from Turkey

The Mujan (Turkish: Mucan, Mocan, Mucanoğulları) (Ottoman Turkish: قارامانلو نامى دیگر موجان) is a Yoruk Turkoman tribe mainly residing in Afyonkarahisar and Denizli provinces in Turkey.

The Mujan tribe traces its origins to the Qaramanlu clan of the Afshar or Salur branch of the Oghuz Turks. In 1706, the Mujan tribesmen rebelled against the Ottoman government to secure the right to a nomadic lifestyle and to protest against heavy taxes.
