= Liia Hänni =

Estonian astrophysicist and politician

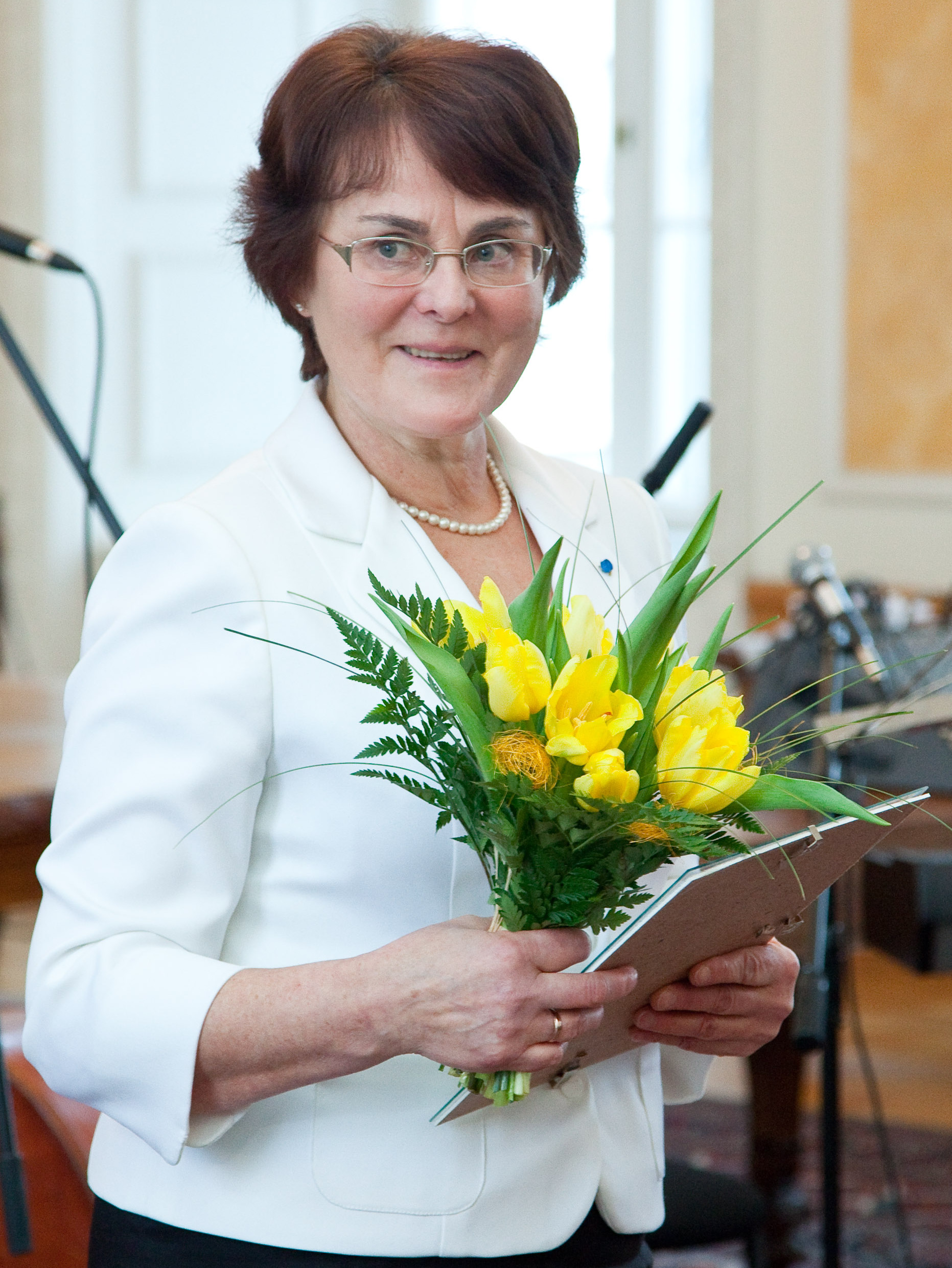

Minister of Reforms
- In office 1992–1995
- Prime Minister: Mart Laar; Andres Tarand
- Preceded by: Position established
- Succeeded by: Position disestablished

Personal details
- Born: Liia Juulik; 4 October 1946 (age 79) Atla, Lümanda Parish, Saare County, then part of Estonian SSR, Soviet Union
- Party: Social Democratic Party
- Spouse: Uku Hänni
- Education: University of Tartu

Liia Hänni (née Juulik; born 4 October 1946) is an Estonian astrophysicist, social activist and former politician who voted for the Estonian restoration of Independence.

== Education ==
Born in Atla, Saare County, Liia Hänni graduated from Saaremaa gymnasium in 1965 and the University of Tartu's Department of Physics in 1970.

== Research activities ==
From 1970 to 1990, Hänni was a junior researcher and senior researcher of the Estonian Academy of Sciences in Astrophysics and the Institute of Atmospheric Physics (later Tartu Observatory). In 1986, the Observatory defended the candidate's thesis in astrophysics "Investigating the Atmosphere of Red Crayfish by the Synthetic Spectrum Method". Her supervisor was Tõnu Kipper. She investigated the stars of the late spectrum class.

Hänni has published scientific articles in various publications. She has been a member of the Estonian Scientists' Union since 1989.

== Publications ==
- Hanni, L. The lithium-rich K-giant 9-Bootis. Soviet Astronomy Letters, 10(1), 51-53 (1984).
- Hanni, L., Sitska, J. On the red giant titanium-oxide bands. Soviet Astronomy Letters, 11(6), 367-369 (1985).
- TiO isotoopide ridade uurimine külmade tähtede spektrites. // Tartu AO Publikatsioonid (1982) 49.
- Liitiumisisaldus hiidtähtede atmosfääris. // Tartu AO Publikatsioonid (1982) 49.
- Evolutsioonilised efektid punaste hiidtähtede keemilises koostises. // Tartu Tähetorni Kalender 1988. aastakas. Tallinn, 1987.

== Political activities ==
Hänni was a part of the Estonian Centre for the Environment Party. She was a member of the Congress of Estonia. In 1992, she was elected to the Riigikogu as a member of what is now the Social Democratic Party (Jõgeva and Tartu electoral district).

She has published articles on privatization and the progress of reforms.

=== Membership in representative bodies ===
- Congress of Estonia 1990–1992
- Constituent Assembly 1991–1992
- Estonian Supreme Soviet 1990–1992
- Riigikogu 1992–1999

Hänni was a member of the Constitutional Committee of the Riigikogu in all its constituencies (As the chairwoman of the 6th Committee). She was the Estonian Minister of Reforms from 1992 to 1995. From 1996 to 1999, she was the President of the Moderate Women organization. Hänni is the program director of the e-Governance Academy, e-democracy and e-participation programs, and since 2011, Member of the Board of the EMSL Board of the Association of Free Alliances.

== Awards ==
- 2001: 3rd Class of the Estonian Order of the National Coat of Arms (received 23 February 2001)
- 2006: 2nd Class of the Estonian Order of the National Coat of Arms (received 23 February 2006)
- 2010: Kodanikuühiskonna Award

== Personal life ==
Liia Hänni is married to Uku Hänni. They have a son, Kristjan. She is a member of the Tartu branch of Zonta International.

== Literature ==
- "Keda me valisime?", Kirjastus "Tartumaa", Tartu 1993
