= Johannes-Andreas Hanni =

Estonian serial killer

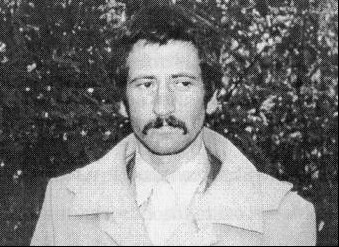
- Born: 24 March 1957; Valga, then part of Estonian SSR, Soviet Union
- Died: 6 November 1982 (aged 25); Tallinn, then part of Estonian SSR, Soviet Union
- Cause of death: Suicide by hanging

Details
- Victims: 3
- Span of crimes: March – September 1982
- Country: Soviet Union
- State: Harju
- Date apprehended: October 1982

Johannes-Andreas Hanni (24 March 1957 – 6 November 1982) was an Estonian serial killer who murdered three people in 1982 with the aid of his wife Pille.

== Early life ==
Johannes-Andreas Hanni was born in Valga in Soviet Estonia, and grew up in a family of devout Baptists. He later claimed he was badly treated by his parents, particularly his minister father Jaan Hanni, whom he came to hate. He had a lengthy record as a juvenile repeat criminal offender and spent a number of his adolescent years in prisons and reformatories. He married Pille Toomla, a trolley driver, on 11 December 1981 and worked as a waiter in the Palace Hotel restaurant in Tallinn.

== The murders ==
Hanni stabbed his first victim to death, Eimar Vibo, a sailor from Saaremaa, on 5 March 1982 in Valdeku Street in Nõmme and cut off part of his thigh and brought the piece home with him. He then explained to his wife that he was going to eat it as he "had wished to try out eating human flesh for a long time already". According to a later interview with police, Toomla claimed her husband did this with "pleasure"; by frying the meat in a pan on top of the stove. On 23 May 1982, in Jõhvi, Hanni stabbed to death a 75-year-old Belarusian pensioner named Ivan Sivitsky in his garden cottage sauna and cut off his genitals, wishing to use it as some kind of a dildo.

In late July of the same year, he raped and killed a middle-aged female Russian vagrant named Yevgenia Koltsova who was picking raspberries in the forest between Laagri and Saue. In late August 1982, Hanni and his wife planned to murder a random taxi driver in Tallinn and on 2 September 1982, the pair carried out the plan; attacking driver Alari Kivi with a knife. Kivi fought back and was left with serious, but not life-threatening injuries. Hanni was arrested in connection to the attack and three murders on 2 October 1982.

== Aftermath ==
Before the court hearings, a psychiatric evaluation of three specialists took place; among them, noted Estonian psychiatrist Anti Liiv. He later wrote: "The Cannibal was especially charmed by female lingerie. He himself preferred to sleep always in a female nightgown and at the time of an intercourse he put on a bra. In addition, Hanni had (with the knowledge of his wife) a multitude of lovers from both sexes."

Johannes-Andreas Hanni later hanged himself in prison before sentencing in November 1982. His wife, Pille Hanni, was convicted on charges of accessory to murder and spent nearly twelve years in Harku Prison before being released. She later changed her name and moved to Finland.

In 2008, Pille Hanni shocked the Estonian public when she published the book Ma armastasin kiskjat ("I Loved the Predator"). Critics such as psychiatrist Anti Liiv took issue with Hanni profiting from the murders and painting herself as a victim, rather than as a willing participant in the murders.

== See also ==
- List of serial killers by country
