= Har Karan Kamboh =

Har Karan Kamboh (d 1631), also known as Har Karan Multani, was a great scholar with deep knowledge of Arabic and Persian languages. He was son of Mathura Das Kamboh and belonged to Multan which was a great center of learning during Mughal reign. His father was also a good poet of Persian language. Har Karan is best known for his book Insha-i-Har Karan written in Persian language during the last days of Jahangir and early days of Shah Jahan.

"One day in the reign of the Emperor Shah Jahan, Har Karan Kamboh had sat at the seat of Empire in the city of Matura (Mathura) in the company of his agreeable companions and chosen friends and devoted himself to improving his skills as Munshi (Secretary)". And there followed a selection of letters to different classes of people indicating how princes write to princes, diplomatic (firmans, parwanahs), letters between notables and legal documents including certificate for the sale of a slave girl etc. The result was his famous Insha-i-Har Karan (The Form of Har Karan) in Persian language which soon became an established model of excellence. The work was compiled between 1625 AD and 1631 AD.

Insha-i-Har Karan is divided into seven sections and contains models of letters and other documents relating to the State. Furthermore, Insha-i-Har Karan was also used as a model for diplomatic correspondence with the native princes and potentates by the British in India and also as a model for school children learning Persian-letter writing in the schools. Not much is known about his other works but Insha-i- Har Karan was indeed considered an excellent book till British rule. It was translated into English language by Francis Balfour M.D. The second edition of it was printed in England in 1804.

In the beginning of his book, Har Karan introduces himself as “the ignorant lowly pauper, the weakest servant of the eternal God, Har Karan, son of Mathuradas Kamboh from Multan” (Faqir-i haqir-i hechmadan, azhaf min ibad Allah As-Samad, Har Karan Valad-i Mathuradas Kamboh Multani).

== See also ==
Kamboj in Muslim and British Era
