= Hanno =

Hanno may refer to:

== People ==
- Hanno (given name)

- Hanunu (8th century BC), Philistine king previously rendered by scholars as "Hanno"

- Hanno (Punic: 𐤇𐤍𐤀, ḤNʾ; Greek: Ἄννων, Hannōn), common Carthaginian name

- Hanno the Navigator, Carthaginian explorer
- Hanno the Elder (died 204 BC), Carthaginian general
- Hanno I the Great (4th century BC), Carthaginian politician and military leader
- Hanno II the Great (3rd century BC), wealthy Carthaginian aristocrat
- Hanno III the Great (2nd century BC), Carthaginian politician
- Hanno, son of Hannibal, Carthaginian general in the First Punic War
- Hanno, Messana garrison commander, Carthaginian general in The First Punic War
- Hanno, son of Bomilcar, Carthaginian officer in the Second Punic War

- Saint Anno or Saint Hanno of Cologne
- Carl von Hanno (1901–1953), Norwegian painter
- Dennis M. Hanno, U.S. college president
- Lillemor von Hanno (1900–1984), Norwegian actress, novelist and playwright
- Wilhelm von Hanno (1826–1882), German-born Norwegian architect, sculptor and painter

== Fictional characters ==
- Hanno, a Carthaginian character in the play Poenulus by the Roman playwright Plautus
- Hanno, fictional character in The Boat of a Million Years, an immortal Phoenician living to our times and beyond
- Hanno Tauber, often called Noah, is a character in the TV series Dark

== Other uses ==
- Hannō, Saitama, Honshū, Japan
- Hanno (crater), a lunar crater
- Hanno (elephant), the pet white elephant of Pope Leo X
- G-AAUD Hanno, a named Handley Page H.P.42 airliner

== See also ==
- Hanna (disambiguation)
- Hanni (disambiguation)
- Hannu (given name)
- Hano (disambiguation)
