= Hanne N. Rasmussen =

Danish scientist and researcher

Hanne N. Rasmussen (born 1950) is a Danish scientist who studies orchid-fungal symbioses.

== Career ==
She is currently a senior researcher at the University of Copenhagen in the Department of Geosciences and Natural Resource Management. Her research has included studies on numerous plant families, but the majority has focused on symbiotic relationships between various fungi and member of the Orchidaceae family. These relationships are called orchid mycorrhiza.

Rasmussen is the author of the book Terrestrial Orchids: from seed to mycotrophic plant (1995). Her most cited articles are on the role of fungal symbionts in orchid seed germination and growth.
