= Battle of Multan (1766) =

1766 battle in between Bhangi Misl and Bahawalpur State

- Part of expansion of the Bhangi Misl
Date	December 1766
Location	Right bank of the Sutlej, opposite Bahawalpur
Result	Inconclusive: territorial division agreed by treaty
Territorial changes	Pakpattan occupied by Bhangi Misl

Belligerents
Bhangi Misl	Bahawalpur State

Commanders and leaders
Jhanda Singh Bhangi; Ganda Singh Bhangi	Mubarik Khan; Shuja Khan

The Battle of Multan was an indecisive engagement fought in December 1766 between the forces of the Bhangi Misl, led by Jhanda Singh Bhangi, Ganda Singh Bhangi, and the combined forces of Mubarik Khan of Bahawalpur State and Shuja Khan, the governor of Multan. The battle took place on the right bank of the Sutlej opposite Bahawalpur. After neither side secured a decisive victory, a treaty was concluded dividing the territory between Bahawalpur and Lahore, with Pakpattan fixed as the line of demarcation.

== Background ==
In 1766, shortly after his accession, Jhanda Singh Bhangi, together with Ganda Singh, marched at the head of a strong force toward Multan. On the way, the Sikh army halted on the right bank of the Sutlej opposite Bahawalpur. According to another account, the expedition took place in December 1766 and also included Lehna Singh Bhangi. The Bhangi sardars declared war against Shuja Khan of Multan and the Daudputras of Bahawalpur.

Mubarik Khan, ruler of Bahawalpur from 1749 to 1772, advanced to oppose the Sikhs. Shuja Khan, the governor of Multan, joined him in resisting the Bhangi advance.

== Battle ==
A severe battle was fought between the Sikh and Muslim forces on the banks of the Sutlej. The engagement is described as grim and inconclusive, with neither side able to claim a clear victory.

== Treaty and territorial settlement ==
After the battle, both sides settled their differences by signing a treaty that split the land between Bahawalpur and Lahore evenly. Pakpattan, located about 208 kilometres from Lahore and 221 kilometres from Bahawalpur, served as the boundary between the two regional powers. Jhanda Singh Bhangi was acknowledged as master of the territory up to and Pakpattan itself, which had earlier been occupied by the Bhangi chiefs from Abdus Subhan, the diwan of Pakpattan.

== Aftermath ==
After the agreement with Shuja Khan of Multan, Jhanda Singh and Ganda Singh moved against the territory of Muhammad Azim Hans, located to the north-west of Pakpattan. However, they had left only a small force behind.
