= Uku Hänni =

Estonian astrophysicist and civil servant

Uku Hänni (born 27 August 1943, in Kullamaa Parish (now Lääne-Nigula Parish)) is an Estonian astrophysicist and civil servant.

He has been a counsellor in Ministry of Finance's Department of Public Property (Estonian: Rahandusministeeriumi riigivara osakonna nõunik).

In 2008, he was awarded with Order of the White Star, IV class He is married to astrophysicist Liia Hänni. They have a son, Kristjan.

== Works ==
- Maaerakondade ajaloost Eestis / Eesti Maa-Keskerakond. Compiled by Uku Hänni and Toivo Jullinen. Tartu : Tallinn : Eesti Maa-Keskerakond, 1995
