= Gowlag =

Gowlag گولگ
- Village
- Location within Iran
- Coordinates: 32°25′49″N 59°01′56″E
- Country: Iran
- Province: South Khorasan
- County: Khusf
- Bakhsh: Jolgeh-e Mazhan
- Rural District: Jolgeh-e Mazhan

Population (2006)
  - Total: 61
- Time zone: UTC+3:30 (IRST)
  - Summer (DST): UTC+4:30 (IRDT)

Gowlag (Persian: گولگ, also Romanized as Gūlag, Gauwalg, Goolag, Goualg, and Gūlak) is a village in Jolgeh-e Mazhan Rural District, Jolgeh-e Mazhan District, Khusf County, South Khorasan Province, Iran. At the 2006 census, its population was 61, in 18 families.
