= Zaboli District =

Former district in Sistan and Baluchestan province, Iran

Zaboli District Persian: بخش زابلی
- Former District
- Location within Iran
- Coordinates: 27°11′N 61°29′E
- Country: Iran
- Province: Sistan and Baluchestan
- County: Saravan
- Capital: Zaboli

Population (2006)
  - Total: 31,679
- Time zone: UTC+3:30 (IRST)

Zaboli District (Persian: بخش زابلی) is a former administrative division of Saravan County, Sistan and Baluchestan province, Iran. Its capital was the city of Zaboli. (Note: Renamed Mehrestan)

== History ==
After the 2006 National Census, the district was separated from the county in the establishment of Zaboli County. (Note: Renamed Mehrestan County)

== Demographics ==
=== Population ===
At the time of the 2006 census, the district's population was 31,679 in 6,872 households.

=== Administrative divisions ===
Zaboli District Population
Administrative Divisions	2006
Birk RD	6,648
Zaboli RD	17,359
Zaboli (city)	7,672
Total	31,679
RD = Rural District
