= Ashar Rural District =

Rural district in Sistan and Baluchestan province, Iran

Ashar Rural District Persian: دهستان آشار
- Rural District
- Location within Iran
- Coordinates: 26°40′35″N 61°41′20″E
- Country: Iran
- Province: Sistan and Baluchestan
- County: Mehrestan
- District: Ashar
- Capital: Ashar

Population (2016)
  - Total: 10,130
- Time zone: UTC+3:30 (IRST)

Ashar Rural District (Persian: دهستان آشار) is in Ashar District of Mehrestan County, (Note: Formerly Zaboli County) Sistan and Baluchestan province, Iran. It is administered from the city of Ashar.

== Demographics ==
=== Population ===
At the time of the 2006 National Census, the rural district's population was 7,884 in 1,552 households, when it was a part of Sarbaz County. There were 12,137 inhabitants in 2,727 households at the following census of 2011, by which time the district had been separated from the county in the establishment of Zaboli County. (Note: Renamed Mehrestan County) The 2016 census measured the population of the rural district as 10,130 in 2,443 households. The most populous of its 33 villages was Ashar (now a city), with 3,786 people.
