= Irafshan Rural District =

Rural district in Sistan and Baluchestan province, Iran

Irafshan Rural District Persian: دهستان ايرافشان
- Rural District
- Location within Iran
- Coordinates: 26°39′23″N 62°05′07″E
- Country: Iran
- Province: Sistan and Baluchestan
- County: Mehrestan
- District: Ashar
- Capital: Irafshan

Population (2016)
  - Total: 5,819
- Time zone: UTC+3:30 (IRST)

Irafshan Rural District (Persian: دهستان ايرافشان) is in Ashar District of Mehrestan County, (Note: Formerly Zaboli County) Sistan and Baluchestan province, Iran. Its capital is the village of Irafshan.

== Demographics ==
=== Population ===
At the time of the 2006 National Census, the rural district's population (as a part of Sarbaz County) was 4,186 in 803 households. There were 5,647 inhabitants in 1,322 households at the following census of 2011, by which time the district had been separated from the county in the establishment of Zaboli County. (Note: Renamed Mehrestan County) The 2016 census measured the population of the rural district as 5,819 in 1,486 households. The most populous of its 36 villages was Irafshan, with 789 people.
