= Birk Rural District =

Rural district in Sistan and Baluchestan province, Iran

Birk Rural District Persian: دهستان بيرك
- Rural District
- Location within Iran
- Coordinates: 27°16′28″N 61°16′04″E
- Country: Iran
- Province: Sistan and Baluchestan
- County: Mehrestan
- District: Birk
- Capital: Regentog

Population (2016)
  - Total: 11,057
- Time zone: UTC+3:30 (IRST)

Birk Rural District (Persian: دهستان بيرك) is in Birk District of Mehrestan County, (Note: Formerly Zaboli County) Sistan and Baluchestan province, Iran. Its capital is the village of Regentog. The previous capital of the rural district was the village of Chahuk.

== Demographics ==
=== Population ===
At the time of the 2006 National Census, the rural district's population (as a part of the former Zaboli District of Saravan County) was 6,648 in 1,461 households. There were 8,683 inhabitants in 2,005 households at the following census of 2011, by which time the district had been separated from the county in the establishment of Zaboli County. (Note: Renamed Mehrestan County) The rural district was transferred to the new Central District. The 2016 census measured the population of the rural district as 11,057 in 2,591 households. The most populous of its 77 villages was Chahuk, with 1,320 people.

After the census, the rural district was separated from the district in the formation of Birk District.

== See also ==
Kahn-e Jan Mohammad, a village in the rural district
