= Zaboli Rural District =

Rural district in Sistan and Baluchestan province, Iran

Zaboli Rural District Persian: دهستان زابلي
- Rural District
- Location within Iran
- Coordinates: 27°10′45″N 61°30′13″E
- Country: Iran
- Province: Sistan and Baluchestan
- County: Mehrestan
- District: Central
- Capital: Mehrestan

Population (2016)
  - Total: 31,328
- Time zone: UTC+3:30 (IRST)

Zaboli Rural District (Persian: دهستان زابلي) is in the Central District of Mehrestan County, (Note: Formerly Zaboli County) Sistan and Baluchestan province, Iran. It is administered from the city of Mehrestan. (Note: Formerly Zaboli)

== Demographics ==
=== Population ===
At the time of the 2006 National Census, the rural district's population (as a part of the former Zaboli District of Saravan County) was 17,359 in 3,851 households. There were 26,177 inhabitants in 6,365 households at the following census of 2011, by which time the district had been separated from the county in the establishment of Zaboli County. (Note: Renamed Mehrestan County) The rural district was transferred to the new Central District. The 2016 census measured the population of the rural district as 31,328 in 7,918 households. The most populous of its 195 villages was Qaderabad, with 2,018 people.
