= Ashar District =

District in Sistan and Baluchestan province, Iran

Ashar District Persian: بخش آشار
- District
- Location within Iran
- Coordinates: 26°40′28″N 61°57′09″E
- Country: Iran
- Province: Sistan and Baluchestan
- County: Mehrestan
- Capital: Ashar

Population (2016)
  - Total: 15,949
- Time zone: UTC+3:30 (IRST)

Ashar District (Persian: بخش آشار) is in Mehrestan County, (Note: Formerly Zaboli County) Sistan and Baluchestan province, Iran. Its capital is the city of Ashar.

== Demographics ==
=== Population ===
At the time of the 2006 National Census, the district's population (as a part of Sarbaz County) was 12,090 in 2,355 households. The following census in 2011 counted 17,784 people in 4,049 households, by which time the district had been separated from the county in the establishment of Zaboli County. (Note: Renamed Mehrestan County) The 2016 census measured the population of the district as 15,949 inhabitants in 3,929 households.

After the census, the village of Ashar was elevated to the status of a city.

=== Administrative divisions ===
Ashar District Population (Note: As a part of Sarbaz County at the 2006 census)
Administrative Divisions	2006	2011	2016
Ashar RD	7,884	12,137	10,130
Irafshan RD	4,186	5,647	5,819
Ashar (city) (Note: Became a city after the 2016 census)			
Total	12,070	17,784	15,949
RD = Rural District
