= Central District (Mehrestan County) =

District in Sistan and Baluchestan province, Iran

Central District (Mehrestan County) Persian: بخش مرکزی شهرستان مهرستان
- District
- Location within Iran
- Coordinates: 27°06′44″N 61°30′26″E
- Country: Iran
- Province: Sistan and Baluchestan
- County: Mehrestan
- Capital: Mehrestan

Population (2016)
  - Total: 54,630
- Time zone: UTC+3:30 (IRST)

The Central District of Mehrestan County (Note: Formerly Zaboli County) (Persian: بخش مرکزی شهرستان مهرستان) is in Sistan and Baluchestan province, Iran. Its capital is the city of Mehrestan. (Note: Formerly Zaboli)

== History ==
After the 2006 National Census, Zaboli District was separated from Saravan County, and Ashar District from Sarbaz County, in the establishment of Zaboli County, (Note: Renamed Mehrestan County) which was divided into two districts of two rural districts each, with Zaboli (Note: Renamed Mehrestan) as its capital and only city at the time.

After the 2016 census, Dehi Rural District was created in the Central District and Birk Rural District was separated from it in the formation of Birk District.

== Demographics ==
=== Population ===
At the time of the 2011 census, the district's population was 44,972 people in 10,541 households. The 2016 census measured the population of the district as 54,630 inhabitants in 13,478 households.

=== Administrative divisions ===
Central District (Mehrestan County) Population
| Administrative Divisions | 2011 | 2016 |
|---|---|---|
| Birk RD (Note: Transferred to Birk District after the 2016 census) | 8,683 | 11,057 |
| Dehi RD (Note: Established after the 2016 census) | | |
| Zaboli RD | 26,177 | 31,328 |
| Mehrestan (city) | 10,112 | 12,245 |
| Total | 44,972 | 54,630 |
RD = Rural District
