= Mehrestan County =

County in Sistan and Baluchestan province, Iran

Mehrestan County Persian: شهرستان مهرستان
- County
- Location of Mehrestan County in Sistan and Baluchestan province (center right, purple)

- Location of Sistan and Baluchestan province in Iran
- Coordinates: 27°01′08″N 61°42′59″E
- Country: Iran
- Province: Sistan and Baluchestan
- Capital: Mehrestan
- Districts: Central, Ashar, Birk

Population (2016)
  - Total: 70,579
- Time zone: UTC+3:30 (IRST)

Mehrestan County (Persian: شهرستان مهرستان) (Note: Formerly Zaboli County (شهرستان زابلی)) is in Sistan and Baluchestan province, Iran. Its capital is the city of Mehrestan. (Note: Formerly Zaboli)

== History ==
After the 2006 National Census, Zaboli District was separated from Saravan County, and Ashar District from Sarbaz County, in the establishment of Zaboli County, (Note: Renamed Mehrestan County) which was divided into two districts of two rural districts each, with Zaboli (Note: Renamed Mehrestan) as its capital and only city at the time.

After the 2016 census, Dehi Rural District was created in the Central District and Birk Rural District was separated from it in the formation of Birk District, including the new Birk-e Sharqi Rural District. The village of Ashar was elevated to the status of a city.

== Demographics ==
=== Population ===
At the time of the 2011 census, the county's population was 62,756 people in 14,577 households. The 2016 census measured the population of the county as 70,579 in 17,407 households.

=== Administrative divisions ===
Mehrestan County's population history and administrative structure over two consecutive censuses are shown in the following table.

Mehrestan County Population
Administrative Divisions	2011	2016
Central District	44,972	54,630
Birk RD	8,683	11,057
Dehi RD (Note: Established after the 2016 census)		
Zaboli RD	26,177	31,328
Mehrestan (city)	10,112	12,245
Ashar District	17,784	15,949
Ashar RD	12,137	10,130
Irafshan RD	5,647	5,819
Ashar (city) (Note: Became a city after the 2016 census)		
Birk District		
Birk RD		
Birk-e Sharqi RD		
Total	62,756	70,579
RD = Rural District

== See also ==
Media related to Mehrestan County at Wikimedia Commons
