= Set function =

Function from sets to numbers

In mathematics, especially measure theory, a set function is a function whose domain is a family of subsets of some given set and that (usually) takes its values in the extended real number line $\R \cup \{ \pm \infty \},$ which consists of the real numbers $\R$ and $\pm \infty.$

A set function generally aims to measure subsets in some way. Measures are typical examples of "measuring" set functions. Therefore, the term "set function" is often used for avoiding confusion between the mathematical meaning of "measure" and its common language meaning.

== Definitions ==
If $\mathcal{F}$ is a family of sets over $\Omega$ (meaning that $\mathcal{F} \subseteq \wp(\Omega)$ where $\wp(\Omega)$ denotes the powerset) then a set function on $\mathcal{F}$ is a function $\mu$ with domain $\mathcal{F}$ and codomain $[-\infty, \infty]$ or, sometimes, the codomain is instead some vector space, as with vector measures, complex measures, and projection-valued measures. The domain of a set function may have any number properties; the commonly encountered properties and categories of families are listed in the table below.

Families $\mathcal{F}$ of sets over $\Omega$
Is necessarily true of $\mathcal{F}\colon$ or, is $\mathcal{F}$ closed under:	Directed by $\,\supseteq$	$A \cap B$	$A \cup B$	$B \setminus A$	$\Omega \setminus A$	$A_1 \cap A_2 \cap \cdots$	$A_1 \cup A_2 \cup \cdots$	$\Omega \in \mathcal{F}$	$\varnothing \in \mathcal{F}$	F.I.P.
π-system	Yes	Yes	No	No	No	No	No	No	No	No
Semiring	Yes	Yes	No	No	No	No	No	No	Yes	Never
Semialgebra (Semifield)	Yes	Yes	No	No	No	No	No	No	Yes	Never
Monotone class	No	No	No	No	No	only if $A_i \searrow$	only if $A_i \nearrow$	No	No	No
𝜆-system (Dynkin System)	Yes	No	No	only if $A \subseteq B$	Yes	No	only if $A_i \nearrow$ or they are disjoint	Yes	Yes	Never
Ring (Order theory)	Yes	Yes	Yes	No	No	No	No	No	No	No
Ring (Measure theory)	Yes	Yes	Yes	Yes	No	No	No	No	Yes	Never
δ-Ring	Yes	Yes	Yes	Yes	No	Yes	No	No	Yes	Never
𝜎-Ring	Yes	Yes	Yes	Yes	No	Yes	Yes	No	Yes	Never
Algebra (Field)	Yes	Yes	Yes	Yes	Yes	No	No	Yes	Yes	Never
𝜎-Algebra (𝜎-Field)	Yes	Yes	Yes	Yes	Yes	Yes	Yes	Yes	Yes	Never
Dual ideal	Yes	Yes	Yes	No	No	No	Yes	Yes	No	No
Filter	Yes	Yes	Yes	Never	Never	No	Yes	Yes	$\varnothing \not\in \mathcal{F}$	Yes
Prefilter (Filter base)	Yes	No	No	Never	Never	No	No	No	$\varnothing \not\in \mathcal{F}$	Yes
Filter subbase	No	No	No	Never	Never	No	No	No	$\varnothing \not\in \mathcal{F}$	Yes
Open Topology	Yes	Yes	Yes	No	No	No	(even arbitrary $\cup$)	Yes	Yes	Never
Closed Topology	Yes	Yes	Yes	No	No	(even arbitrary $\cap$)	No	Yes	Yes	Never
Is necessarily true of $\mathcal{F}\colon$ or, is $\mathcal{F}$ closed under:	directed downward	finite intersections	finite unions	relative complements	complements in $\Omega$	countable intersections	countable unions	contains $\Omega$	contains $\varnothing$	Finite; Intersection; Property
Additionally, a semiring is a π-system where every complement $B \setminus A$ is equal to a finite disjoint union of sets in $\mathcal{F}.$ A semialgebra is a semiring where every complement $\Omega \setminus A$ is equal to a finite disjoint union of sets in $\mathcal{F}.$ $A, B, A_1, A_2, \ldots$ are arbitrary elements of $\mathcal{F}$ and it is assumed that $\mathcal{F} \neq \varnothing.$

In general, it is typically assumed that $\mu(E) + \mu(F)$ is always well-defined for all $E, F \in \mathcal{F},$ or equivalently, that $\mu$ does not take on both $- \infty$ and $+ \infty$ as values. This article will henceforth assume this; although alternatively, all definitions below could instead be qualified by statements such as "whenever the sum/series is defined". This is sometimes done with subtraction, such as with the following result, which holds whenever $\mu$ is finitely additive:

Set difference formula: $\mu(F) - \mu(E) = \mu(F \setminus E) \text{ whenever } \mu(F) - \mu(E)$ is defined with $E, F \in \mathcal{F}$ satisfying $E \subseteq F$ and $F \setminus E \in \mathcal{F}.$

Null sets

A set $F \in \mathcal{F}$ is called a null set (with respect to $\mu$) or simply null if $\mu(F) = 0.$ Whenever $\mu$ is not identically equal to either $-\infty$ or $+\infty$ then it is typically also assumed that:

- null empty set: $\mu(\varnothing) = 0$ if $\varnothing \in \mathcal{F}.$

Variation and mass

The total variation of a set $S$ is $|\mu|(S) ~\stackrel{\scriptscriptstyle\text{def}}{=}~ \sup \{ |\mu(F)| : F \in \mathcal{F} \text{ and } F \subseteq S \}$ where $|\,\cdot\,|$ denotes the absolute value (or more generally, it denotes the norm or seminorm if $\mu$ is vector-valued in a (semi)normed space). Assuming that $\cup \mathcal{F} ~\stackrel{\scriptscriptstyle\text{def}}{=}~ \textstyle\bigcup\limits_{F \in \mathcal{F}} F \in \mathcal{F},$ then $|\mu|\left(\cup \mathcal{F}\right)$ is called the total variation of $\mu$ and $\mu\left(\cup \mathcal{F}\right)$ is called the mass of $\mu.$

A set function is called finite if for every $F \in \mathcal{F},$ the value $\mu(F)$ is finite (which by definition means that $\mu(F) \neq \infty$ and $\mu(F) \neq -\infty$; an infinite value is one that is equal to $\infty$ or $- \infty$). Every finite set function must have a finite mass.

=== Common properties of set functions ===
A set function $\mu$ on $\mathcal{F}$ is said to be

- non-negative if it is valued in $[0, \infty].$
- finitely additive if $\textstyle\sum\limits_{i=1}^n \mu\left(F_i\right) = \mu\left(\textstyle\bigcup\limits_{i=1}^n F_i\right)$ for all pairwise disjoint finite sequences $F_1, \ldots, F_n \in \mathcal{F}$ such that $\textstyle\bigcup\limits_{i=1}^n F_i \in \mathcal{F}.$
  - If $\mathcal{F}$ is closed under binary unions then $\mu$ is finitely additive if and only if $\mu(E \cup F) = \mu(E) + \mu(F)$ for all disjoint pairs $E, F \in \mathcal{F}.$
  - If $\mu$ is finitely additive and if $\varnothing \in \mathcal{F}$ then taking $E := F := \varnothing$ shows that $\mu(\varnothing) = \mu(\varnothing) + \mu(\varnothing)$ which is only possible if $\mu(\varnothing) = 0$ or $\mu(\varnothing) = \pm \infty,$ where in the latter case, $\mu(E) = \mu(E \cup \varnothing) = \mu(E) + \mu(\varnothing) = \mu(E) + (\pm \infty) = \pm \infty$ for every $E \in \mathcal{F}$ (so only the case $\mu(\varnothing) = 0$ is useful).
- countably additive or σ-additive if in addition to being finitely additive, for all pairwise disjoint sequences $F_1, F_2, \ldots\,$ in $\mathcal{F}$ such that $\textstyle\bigcup\limits_{i=1}^\infty F_i \in \mathcal{F},$ all of the following hold:
  1. $\textstyle\sum\limits_{i=1}^\infty \mu\left(F_i\right) = \mu\left(\textstyle\bigcup\limits_{i=1}^\infty F_i\right)$
    - The series on the left hand side is defined in the usual way as the limit $\textstyle\sum\limits_{i=1}^\infty \mu\left(F_i\right) ~\stackrel{\scriptscriptstyle\text{def}}{=}~ {\displaystyle\lim_{n \to \infty}} \mu\left(F_1\right) + \cdots + \mu\left(F_n\right).$
    - As a consequence, if $\rho : \N \to \N$ is any permutation/bijection then $\textstyle\sum\limits_{i=1}^\infty \mu\left(F_i\right) = \textstyle\sum\limits_{i=1}^\infty \mu\left(F_{\rho(i)}\right);$ this is because $\textstyle\bigcup\limits_{i=1}^\infty F_i = \textstyle\bigcup\limits_{i=1}^\infty F_{\rho(i)}$ and applying this condition (a) twice guarantees that both $\textstyle\sum\limits_{i=1}^\infty \mu\left(F_i\right) = \mu\left(\textstyle\bigcup\limits_{i=1}^\infty F_i\right)$ and $\mu\left(\textstyle\bigcup\limits_{i=1}^\infty F_{\rho(i)}\right) = \textstyle\sum\limits_{i=1}^\infty \mu\left(F_{\rho(i)}\right)$ hold. By definition, a convergent series with this property is said to be unconditionally convergent. Stated in plain English, this means that rearranging/relabeling the sets $F_1, F_2, \ldots$ to the new order $F_{\rho(1)}, F_{\rho(2)}, \ldots$ does not affect the sum of their measures. This is desirable since just as the union $F ~\stackrel{\scriptscriptstyle\text{def}}{=}~ \textstyle\bigcup\limits_{i \in \N} F_i$ does not depend on the order of these sets, the same should be true of the sums $\mu(F) = \mu\left(F_1\right) + \mu\left(F_2\right) + \cdots$ and $\mu(F) = \mu\left(F_{\rho(1)}\right) + \mu\left(F_{\rho(2)}\right) + \cdots\,.$
  2. if $\mu\left(\textstyle\bigcup\limits_{i=1}^\infty F_i\right)$ is not infinite then this series $\textstyle\sum\limits_{i=1}^\infty \mu\left(F_i\right)$ must also converge absolutely, which by definition means that $\textstyle\sum\limits_{i=1}^\infty \left|\mu\left(F_i\right)\right|$ must be finite. This is automatically true if $\mu$ is non-negative (or even just valued in the extended real numbers).
    - As with any convergent series of real numbers, by the Riemann series theorem, the series $\textstyle\sum\limits_{i=1}^\infty \mu\left(F_i\right) = {\displaystyle\lim_{N \to \infty}} \mu\left(F_1\right) + \mu\left(F_2\right) + \cdots + \mu\left(F_N\right)$ converges absolutely if and only if its sum does not depend on the order of its terms (a property known as unconditional convergence). Since unconditional convergence is guaranteed by (a) above, this condition is automatically true if $\mu$ is valued in $[-\infty, \infty].$
  3. if $\mu\left(\textstyle\bigcup\limits_{i=1}^\infty F_i\right) = \textstyle\sum\limits_{i=1}^\infty \mu\left(F_i\right)$ is infinite then it is also required that the value of at least one of the series $\textstyle\sum\limits_{\stackrel{i \in \N}{\mu\left(F_i\right) > 0}} \mu\left(F_i\right) \; \text{ and } \; \textstyle\sum\limits_{\stackrel{i \in \N}{\mu\left(F_i\right) < 0}} \mu\left(F_i\right) \;$ be finite (so that the sum of their values is well-defined). This is automatically true if $\mu$ is non-negative.
- a pre-measure if it is non-negative, countably additive (including finitely additive), and has a null empty set.
- a measure if it is a pre-measure whose domain is a σ-algebra. That is to say, a measure is a non-negative countably additive set function on a σ-algebra that has a null empty set.
- a probability measure if it is a measure that has a mass of $1.$
- an outer measure if it is non-negative, countably subadditive, has a null empty set, and has the power set $\wp(\Omega)$ as its domain.
  - Outer measures appear in the Carathéodory's extension theorem and they are often restricted to Carathéodory measurable subsets
- a signed measure if it is countably additive, has a null empty set, and $\mu$ does not take on both $- \infty$ and $+ \infty$ as values.
- complete if every subset of every null set is null; explicitly, this means: whenever $F \in \mathcal{F} \text{ satisfies } \mu(F) = 0$ and $N \subseteq F$ is any subset of $F$ then $N \in \mathcal{F}$ and $\mu(N) = 0.$
  - Unlike many other properties, completeness places requirements on the set $\operatorname{domain} \mu = \mathcal{F}$ (and not just on $\mu$'s values).
- 𝜎-finite if there exists a sequence $F_1, F_2, F_3, \ldots\,$ in $\mathcal{F}$ such that $\mu\left(F_i\right)$ is finite for every index $i,$ and also $\textstyle\bigcup\limits_{n=1}^\infty F_n = \textstyle\bigcup\limits_{F \in \mathcal{F}} F.$
- decomposable if there exists a subfamily $\mathcal{P} \subseteq \mathcal{F}$ of pairwise disjoint sets such that $\mu(P)$ is finite for every $P \in \mathcal{P}$ and also $\textstyle\bigcup\limits_{P \in \mathcal{P}} \, P = \textstyle\bigcup\limits_{F \in \mathcal{F}} F$ (where $\mathcal{F} = \operatorname{domain} \mu$).
  - Every 𝜎-finite set function is decomposable although not conversely. For example, the counting measure on $\R$ (whose domain is $\wp(\R)$) is decomposable but not 𝜎-finite.
- a vector measure if it is a countably additive set function $\mu : \mathcal{F} \to X$ valued in a topological vector space $X$ (such as a normed space) whose domain is a σ-algebra.
  - If $\mu$ is valued in a normed space $(X, \|\cdot\|)$ then it is countably additive if and only if for any pairwise disjoint sequence $F_1, F_2, \ldots\,$ in $\mathcal{F},$ $\lim_{n \to \infty} \left\|\mu\left(F_1\right) + \cdots + \mu\left(F_n\right) - \mu\left(\textstyle\bigcup\limits_{i=1}^\infty F_i\right)\right\| = 0.$ If $\mu$ is finitely additive and valued in a Banach space then it is countably additive if and only if for any pairwise disjoint sequence $F_1, F_2, \ldots\,$ in $\mathcal{F},$ $\lim_{n \to \infty} \left\|\mu\left(F_n \cup F_{n+1} \cup F_{n+2} \cup \cdots\right)\right\| = 0.$
- a complex measure if it is a countably additive complex-valued set function $\mu : \mathcal{F} \to \Complex$ whose domain is a σ-algebra.
  - By definition, a complex measure never takes $\pm \infty$ as a value and so has a null empty set.
- a random measure if it is a measure-valued random element.

Arbitrary sums

As described in this article's section on generalized series, for any family $\left(r_i\right)_{i \in I}$ of real numbers indexed by an arbitrary indexing set $I,$ it is possible to define their sum $\textstyle\sum\limits_{i \in I} r_i$ as the limit of the net of finite partial sums $F \in \operatorname{FiniteSubsets}(I) \mapsto \textstyle\sum\limits_{i \in F} r_i$ where the domain $\operatorname{FiniteSubsets}(I)$ is directed by $\,\subseteq.\,$ Whenever this net converges then its limit is denoted by the symbols $\textstyle\sum\limits_{i \in I} r_i$ while if this net instead diverges to $\pm \infty$ then this may be indicated by writing $\textstyle\sum\limits_{i \in I} r_i = \pm \infty.$ Any sum over the empty set is defined to be zero; that is, if $I = \varnothing$ then $\textstyle\sum\limits_{i \in \varnothing} r_i = 0$ by definition.

For example, if $z_i = 0$ for every $i \in I$ then $\textstyle\sum\limits_{i \in I} z_i = 0.$ And it can be shown that $\textstyle\sum\limits_{i \in I} r_i = \textstyle\sum\limits_{\stackrel{i \in I,}{r_i = 0}} r_i + \textstyle\sum\limits_{\stackrel{i \in I,}{r_i \neq 0}} r_i = 0 + \textstyle\sum\limits_{\stackrel{i \in I,}{r_i \neq 0}} r_i = \textstyle\sum\limits_{\stackrel{i \in I,}{r_i \neq 0}} r_i.$ If $I = \N$ then the generalized series $\textstyle\sum\limits_{i \in I} r_i$ converges in $\R$ if and only if $\textstyle\sum\limits_{i=1}^\infty r_i$ converges unconditionally (or equivalently, converges absolutely) in the usual sense. If a generalized series $\textstyle\sum\limits_{i \in I} r_i$ converges in $\R$ then both $\textstyle\sum\limits_{\stackrel{i \in I}{r_i > 0}} r_i$ and $\textstyle\sum\limits_{\stackrel{i \in I}{r_i < 0}} r_i$ also converge to elements of $\R$ and the set $\left\{i \in I : r_i \neq 0\right\}$ is necessarily countable (that is, either finite or countably infinite); this remains true if $\R$ is replaced with any normed space. (Note: Suppose the net $\textstyle\sum\limits_{i \in I} r_i ~\stackrel{\scriptscriptstyle\text{def}}{=}~ {\textstyle\lim\limits_{A \in \operatorname{Finite}(I)}} \ \textstyle\sum\limits_{i \in A} r_i = \lim \left\{\textstyle\sum\limits_{i\in A} r_i \,: A \subseteq I, A \text{ finite }\right\}$ converges to some point in a metrizable topological vector space $X$ (such as $\Reals,$ $\Complex,$ or a normed space), where recall that this net's domain is the directed set $(\operatorname{Finite}(I), \subseteq).$ Like every convergent net, this convergent net of partial sums $A \mapsto \textstyle\sum\limits_{i \in A} r_i$ is a Cauchy net, which for this particular net means (by definition) that for every neighborhood $W$ of the origin in $X,$ there exists a finite subset $A_0$ of $I$ such that $\textstyle\sum\limits_{i \in B} r_i - \textstyle\sum\limits_{i \in C} r_i \in W$ for all finite supersets $B, C \supseteq A_0;$ this implies that $r_i \in W$ for every $i \in I \setminus A_0$ (by taking $B := A_0 \cup \{i\}$ and $C := A_0$). Since $X$ is metrizable, it has a countable neighborhood basis $U_1, U_2, \ldots$ at the origin, whose intersection is necessarily $U_1 \cap U_2 \cap \cdots = \{0\}$ (since $X$ is a Hausdorff TVS). For every positive integer $n \in \N,$ pick a finite subset $A_n \subseteq I$ such that $r_i \in U_n$ for every $i \in I \setminus A_n.$ If $i$ belongs to $(I \setminus A_1) \cap (I \setminus A_2) \cap \cdots = I \setminus \left(A_1 \cup A_2 \cup \cdots\right)$ then $r_i$ belongs to $U_1 \cap U_2 \cap \cdots = \{0\}.$ Thus $r_i = 0$ for every index $i \in I$ that does not belong to the countable set $A_1 \cup A_2 \cup \cdots.$ $\blacksquare$) It follows that in order for a generalized series $\textstyle\sum\limits_{i \in I} r_i$ to converge in $\R$ or $\Complex,$ it is necessary that all but at most countably many $r_i$ will be equal to $0,$ which means that $\textstyle\sum\limits_{i \in I} r_i ~=~ \textstyle\sum\limits_{\stackrel{i \in I}{r_i \neq 0}} r_i$ is a sum of at most countably many non-zero terms. Said differently, if $\left\{i \in I : r_i \neq 0\right\}$ is uncountable then the generalized series $\textstyle\sum\limits_{i \in I} r_i$ does not converge.

In summary, due to the nature of the real numbers and its topology, every generalized series of real numbers (indexed by an arbitrary set) that converges can be reduced to an ordinary absolutely convergent series of countably many real numbers. So in the context of measure theory, there is little benefit gained by considering uncountably many sets and generalized series. In particular, this is why the definition of "countably additive" is rarely extended from countably many sets $F_1, F_2, \ldots\,$ in $\mathcal{F}$ (and the usual countable series $\textstyle\sum\limits_{i=1}^\infty \mu\left(F_i\right)$) to arbitrarily many sets $\left(F_i\right)_{i \in I}$ (and the generalized series $\textstyle\sum\limits_{i \in I} \mu\left(F_i\right)$).

=== Inner measures, outer measures, and other properties ===
A set function $\mu$ is said to be/satisfies

- monotone if $\mu(E) \leq \mu(F)$ whenever $E, F \in \mathcal{F}$ satisfy $E \subseteq F.$
- modular if it satisfies the following condition, known as modularity: $\mu(E \cup F) + \mu(E \cap F) = \mu(E) + \mu(F)$ for all $E, F \in \mathcal{F}$ such that $E \cup F, E \cap F \in \mathcal{F}.$
  - Every finitely additive function on a field of sets is modular.
  - In geometry, a set function valued in some abelian semigroup that possess this property is known as a valuation. This geometric definition of "valuation" should not be confused with the stronger non-equivalent measure theoretic definition of "valuation" that is given below.
- submodular if $\mu(E \cup F) + \mu(E \cap F) \leq \mu(E) + \mu(F)$ for all $E, F \in \mathcal{F}$ such that $E \cup F, E \cap F \in \mathcal{F}.$
- finitely subadditive if $|\mu(F)| \leq \textstyle\sum\limits_{i=1}^n \left|\mu\left(F_i\right)\right|$ for all finite sequences $F, F_1, \ldots, F_n \in \mathcal{F}$ that satisfy $F \;\subseteq\; \textstyle\bigcup\limits_{i=1}^n F_i.$
- countably subadditive or σ-subadditive if $|\mu(F)| \leq \textstyle\sum\limits_{i=1}^\infty \left|\mu\left(F_i\right)\right|$ for all sequences $F, F_1, F_2, F_3, \ldots\,$ in $\mathcal{F}$ that satisfy $F \;\subseteq\; \textstyle\bigcup\limits_{i=1}^\infty F_i.$
  - If $\mathcal{F}$ is closed under finite unions then this condition holds if and only if $|\mu(F \cup G)| \leq| \mu(F)| + |\mu(G)|$ for all $F, G \in \mathcal{F}.$ If $\mu$ is non-negative then the absolute values may be removed.
  - If $\mu$ is a measure then this condition holds if and only if $\mu\left(\textstyle\bigcup\limits_{i=1}^\infty F_i\right) \leq \textstyle\sum\limits_{i=1}^\infty \mu\left(F_i\right)$ for all $F_1, F_2, F_3, \ldots\,$ in $\mathcal{F}.$ If $\mu$ is a probability measure then this inequality is Boole's inequality.
  - If $\mu$ is countably subadditive and $\varnothing \in \mathcal{F}$ with $\mu(\varnothing) = 0$ then $\mu$ is finitely subadditive.
- superadditive if $\mu(E) + \mu(F) \leq \mu(E \cup F)$ whenever $E, F \in \mathcal{F}$ are disjoint with $E \cup F \in \mathcal{F}.$
- continuous from above if $\lim_{n \to \infty} \mu\left(F_i\right) = \mu\left(\textstyle\bigcap\limits_{i=1}^\infty F_i\right)$ for all non-increasing sequences of sets $F_1 \supseteq F_2 \supseteq F_3 \cdots\,$ in $\mathcal{F}$ such that $\textstyle\bigcap\limits_{i=1}^\infty F_i \in \mathcal{F}$ with $\mu\left(\textstyle\bigcap\limits_{i=1}^\infty F_i\right)$ and all $\mu\left(F_i\right)$ finite.
  - Lebesgue measure $\lambda$ is continuous from above but it would not be if the assumption that all $\mu\left(F_i\right)$ are eventually finite was omitted from the definition, as this example shows: For every integer $i,$ let $F_i$ be the open interval $(i, \infty)$ so that $\lim_{n \to \infty} \lambda\left(F_i\right) = \lim_{n \to \infty} \infty = \infty \neq 0 = \lambda(\varnothing) = \lambda\left(\textstyle\bigcap\limits_{i=1}^\infty F_i\right)$ where $\textstyle\bigcap\limits_{i=1}^\infty F_i = \varnothing.$
- continuous from below if $\lim_{n \to \infty} \mu\left(F_i\right) = \mu\left(\textstyle\bigcup\limits_{i=1}^\infty F_i\right)$ for all non-decreasing sequences of sets $F_1 \subseteq F_2 \subseteq F_3 \cdots\,$ in $\mathcal{F}$ such that $\textstyle\bigcup\limits_{i=1}^\infty F_i \in \mathcal{F}.$
- infinity is approached from below if whenever $F \in \mathcal{F}$ satisfies $\mu(F) = \infty$ then for every real $r > 0,$ there exists some $F_r \in \mathcal{F}$ such that $F_r \subseteq F$ and $r \leq \mu\left(F_r\right) < \infty.$
- an outer measure if $\mu$ is non-negative, countably subadditive, has a null empty set, and has the power set $\wp(\Omega)$ as its domain.
- an inner measure if $\mu$ is non-negative, superadditive, continuous from above, has a null empty set, has the power set $\wp(\Omega)$ as its domain, and $+\infty$ is approached from below.
- atomic if every measurable set of positive measure contains an atom.

If a binary operation $\,+\,$ is defined, then a set function $\mu$ is said to be

- translation invariant if $\mu(\omega + F) = \mu(F)$ for all $\omega \in \Omega$ and $F \in \mathcal{F}$ such that $\omega + F \in \mathcal{F}.$

=== Topology related definitions ===
If $\tau$ is a topology on $\Omega$ then a set function $\mu$ is said to be:

- a Borel measure if it is a measure defined on the σ-algebra of all Borel sets, which is the smallest σ-algebra containing all open subsets (that is, containing $\tau$).
- a Baire measure if it is a measure defined on the σ-algebra of all Baire sets.
- locally finite if for every point $\omega \in \Omega$ there exists some neighborhood $U \in \mathcal{F} \cap \tau$ of this point such that $\mu(U)$ is finite.
  - If $\mu$ is a finitely additive, monotone, and locally finite then $\mu(K)$ is necessarily finite for every compact measurable subset $K.$
- $\tau$-additive if $\mu\left({\textstyle\bigcup} \, \mathcal{D}\right) = \sup_{D \in \mathcal{D}} \mu(D)$ whenever $\mathcal{D} \subseteq \tau \cap \mathcal{F}$ is directed with respect to $\,\subseteq\,$ and satisfies ${\textstyle\bigcup} \, \mathcal{D} ~\stackrel{\scriptscriptstyle\text{def}}{=}~ \textstyle\bigcup\limits_{D \in \mathcal{D}} D \in \mathcal{F}.$
  - $\mathcal{D}$ is directed with respect to $\,\subseteq\,$ if and only if it is not empty and for all $A, B \in \mathcal{D}$ there exists some $C \in \mathcal{D}$ such that $A \subseteq C$ and $B \subseteq C.$
- inner regular or tight if for every $F \in \mathcal{F},$ $\mu(F) = \sup \{\mu(K) : F \supseteq K \text{ with } K \in \mathcal{F} \text{ a compact subset of } (\Omega, \tau)\}.$
- outer regular if for every $F \in \mathcal{F},$ $\mu(F) = \inf \{\mu(U) : F \subseteq U \text{ and } U \in \mathcal{F} \cap \tau\}.$
- regular if it is both inner regular and outer regular.
- a Borel regular measure if it is a Borel measure that is also regular.
- a Radon measure if it is a regular and locally finite measure.
- strictly positive if every non-empty open subset has (strictly) positive measure.
- a valuation if it is non-negative, monotone, modular, has a null empty set, and has domain $\tau.$

=== Relationships between set functions ===
If $\mu$ and $\nu$ are two set functions over $\Omega,$ then:

- $\mu$ is said to be absolutely continuous with respect to $\nu$ or dominated by $\nu$, written $\mu \ll \nu,$ if for every set $F$ that belongs to the domain of both $\mu$ and $\nu,$ if $\nu(F) = 0$ then $\mu(F) = 0.$
  - If $\mu$ and $\nu$ are $\sigma$-finite measures on the same measurable space and if $\mu \ll \nu,$ then the Radon–Nikodym derivative $\frac{d \mu}{d \nu}$ exists and for every measurable $F,$ $\mu(F) = \int_F \frac{d \mu}{d \nu} d \nu.$
  - $\mu$ and $\nu$ are called equivalent if each one is absolutely continuous with respect to the other. $\mu$ is called a supporting measure of a measure $\nu$ if $\mu$ is $\sigma$-finite and they are equivalent.
- $\mu$ and $\nu$ are singular, written $\mu \perp \nu,$ if there exist disjoint sets $M$ and $N$ in the domains of $\mu$ and $\nu$ such that $M \cup N = \Omega,$ $\mu(F) = 0$ for all $F \subseteq M$ in the domain of $\mu,$ and $\nu(F) = 0$ for all $F \subseteq N$ in the domain of $\nu.$

== Examples ==
Examples of set functions include:

- The function $d(A) = \lim_{n \to \infty} \frac{|A \cap \{1, \ldots, n\}|}{n},$ assigning densities to sufficiently well-behaved subsets $A \subseteq \{1, 2, 3, \ldots\},$ is a set function.
- A probability measure assigns a probability to each set in a σ-algebra. Specifically, the probability of the empty set is zero and the probability of the sample space is $1,$ with other sets given probabilities between $0$ and $1.$
- A possibility measure assigns a number between zero and one to each set in the powerset of some given set. See possibility theory.
- A random set is a set-valued random variable. See the article random compact set.

The Jordan measure on $\Reals^n$ is a set function defined on the set of all Jordan measurable subsets of $\Reals^n;$ it sends a Jordan measurable set to its Jordan measure.

=== Lebesgue measure ===
The Lebesgue measure on $\Reals$ is a set function that assigns a non-negative real number to every set of real numbers that belongs to the Lebesgue $\sigma$-algebra.

Its definition begins with the set $\operatorname{Intervals}(\Reals)$ of all intervals of real numbers, which is a semialgebra on $\Reals.$ The function that assigns to every interval $I$ its $\operatorname{length}(I)$ is a finitely additive set function (explicitly, if $I$ has endpoints $a \leq b$ then $\operatorname{length}(I) = b - a$). This set function can be extended to the Lebesgue outer measure on $\Reals,$ which is the translation-invariant set function $\lambda^{\!*\!} : \wp(\Reals) \to [0, \infty]$ that sends a subset $E \subseteq \Reals$ to the infimum $\lambda^{\!*\!}(E) = \inf \left\{\sum_{k=1}^\infty \operatorname{length}(I_k) : {(I_k)_{k \in \N}} \text{ is a sequence of open intervals with } E \subseteq \bigcup_{k=1}^\infty I_k\right\}.$ Lebesgue outer measure is not countably additive (and so is not a measure) although its restriction to the 𝜎-algebra of all subsets $M \subseteq \Reals$ that satisfy the Carathéodory criterion: $\lambda^{\!*\!}(M) = \lambda^{\!*\!}(M \cap E) + \lambda^{\!*\!}(M \cap E^c) \quad \text{ for every } S \subseteq \Reals$ is a measure that called Lebesgue measure. Vitali sets are examples of non-measurable sets of real numbers.

==== Infinite-dimensional space ====
As detailed in the article on infinite-dimensional Lebesgue measure, the only locally finite and translation-invariant Borel measure on an infinite-dimensional separable normed space is the trivial measure. However, it is possible to define Gaussian measures on infinite-dimensional topological vector spaces. The structure theorem for Gaussian measures shows that the abstract Wiener space construction is essentially the only way to obtain a strictly positive Gaussian measure on a separable Banach space.

=== Finitely additive translation-invariant set functions ===
The only translation-invariant measure on $\Omega = \Reals$ with domain $\wp(\Reals)$ that is finite on every compact subset of $\Reals$ is the trivial set function $\wp(\Reals) \to [0, \infty]$ that is identically equal to $0$ (that is, it sends every $S \subseteq \Reals$ to $0$) However, if countable additivity is weakened to finite additivity then a non-trivial set function with these properties does exist and moreover, some are even valued in $[0, 1].$ In fact, such non-trivial set functions will exist even if $\Reals$ is replaced by any other abelian group $G.$

Theorem—If $(G, +)$ is any abelian group then there exists a finitely additive and translation-invariant (Note: The function $\mu$ being translation-invariant means that $\mu(S) = \mu(g + S)$ for every $g \in G$ and every subset $S \subseteq G.$) set function $\mu : \wp(G) \to [0, 1]$ of mass $\mu(G) = 1.$

== Extending set functions ==
=== Extending from semialgebras to algebras ===
Suppose that $\mu$ is a set function on a semialgebra $\mathcal{F}$ over $\Omega$ and let $\operatorname{algebra}(\mathcal{F}) := \left\{ F_1 \sqcup \cdots \sqcup F_n : n \in \N \text{ and } F_1, \ldots, F_n \in \mathcal{F} \text{ are pairwise disjoint } \right\},$ which is the algebra on $\Omega$ generated by $\mathcal{F}.$ The archetypal example of a semialgebra that is not also an algebra is the family $\mathcal{S}_d := \{ \varnothing \} \cup \left\{ \left(a_1, b_1\right] \times \cdots \times \left(a_1, b_1\right] ~:~ -\infty \leq a_i < b_i \leq \infty \text{ for all } i = 1, \ldots, d \right\}$ on $\Omega := \R^d$ where $(a, b] := \{ x \in \R : a < x \leq b \}$ for all $-\infty \leq a < b \leq \infty.$ Importantly, the two non-strict inequalities $\,\leq\,$ in $-\infty \leq a_i < b_i \leq \infty$ cannot be replaced with strict inequalities $\,<\,$ since semialgebras must contain the whole underlying set $\R^d;$ that is, $\R^d \in \mathcal{S}_d$ is a requirement of semialgebras (as is $\varnothing \in \mathcal{S}_d$).

If $\mu$ is finitely additive then it has a unique extension to a set function $\overline{\mu}$ on $\operatorname{algebra}(\mathcal{F})$ defined by sending $F_1 \sqcup \cdots \sqcup F_n \in \operatorname{algebra}(\mathcal{F})$ (where $\,\sqcup\,$ indicates that these $F_i \in \mathcal{F}$ are pairwise disjoint) to: $\overline{\mu}\left(F_1 \sqcup \cdots \sqcup F_n\right) := \mu\left(F_1\right) + \cdots + \mu\left(F_n\right).$ This extension $\overline{\mu}$ will also be finitely additive: for any pairwise disjoint $A_1, \ldots, A_n \in \operatorname{algebra}(\mathcal{F}),$ $\overline{\mu}\left(A_1 \cup \cdots \cup A_n\right) = \overline{\mu}\left(A_1\right) + \cdots + \overline{\mu}\left(A_n\right).$

If in addition $\mu$ is extended real-valued and monotone (which, in particular, will be the case if $\mu$ is non-negative) then $\overline{\mu}$ will be monotone and finitely subadditive: for any $A, A_1, \ldots, A_n \in \operatorname{algebra}(\mathcal{F})$ such that $A \subseteq A_1 \cup \cdots \cup A_n,$ $\overline{\mu}\left(A\right) \leq \overline{\mu}\left(A_1\right) + \cdots + \overline{\mu}\left(A_n\right).$

=== Extending from rings to σ-algebras ===
If $\mu : \mathcal{F} \to [0, \infty]$ is a pre-measure on a ring of sets (such as an algebra of sets) $\mathcal{F}$ over $\Omega$ then $\mu$ has an extension to a measure $\overline{\mu} : \sigma(\mathcal{F}) \to [0, \infty]$ on the σ-algebra $\sigma(\mathcal{F})$ generated by $\mathcal{F}.$ If $\mu$ is σ-finite then this extension is unique.

To define this extension, first extend $\mu$ to an outer measure $\mu^*$ on $2^\Omega = \wp(\Omega)$ by $\mu^*(T) = \inf \left\{\sum_n \mu\left(S_n\right) : T \subseteq \cup_n S_n \text{ with } S_1, S_2, \ldots \in \mathcal{F}\right\}$ and then restrict it to the set $\mathcal{F}_M$ of $\mu^*$-measurable sets (that is, Carathéodory-measurable sets), which is the set of all $M \subseteq \Omega$ such that $\mu^*(S) = \mu^*(S \cap M) + \mu^*(S \cap M^\mathrm{c}) \quad \text{ for every subset } S \subseteq \Omega.$ It is a $\sigma$-algebra and $\mu^*$ is sigma-additive on it, by Caratheodory lemma.

=== Restricting outer measures ===
If $\mu^* : \wp(\Omega) \to [0, \infty]$ is an outer measure on a set $\Omega,$ where (by definition) the domain is necessarily the power set $\wp(\Omega)$ of $\Omega,$ then a subset $M \subseteq \Omega$ is called $\mu^*$–measurable or Carathéodory-measurable if it satisfies the following Carathéodory's criterion: $\mu^*(S) = \mu^*(S \cap M) + \mu^*(S \cap M^\mathrm{c}) \quad \text{ for every subset } S \subseteq \Omega,$ where $M^\mathrm{c} := \Omega \setminus M$ is the complement of $M.$

The family of all $\mu^*$–measurable subsets is a σ-algebra and the restriction of the outer measure $\mu^*$ to this family is a measure.

== See also ==
- Absolute continuity (measure theory) – Form of continuity for functions
- Boolean ring – Algebraic structure in mathematics
- Cylinder set measure – way to generate a measure over product spaces
- Field of sets – Algebraic concept in measure theory, also referred to as an algebra of sets
- Hadwiger's theorem – Theorem in integral geometry
- Hahn decomposition theorem – Measurability theorem
- Invariant measure – Concept in mathematics
- Lebesgue's decomposition theorem
- Positive and negative sets
- Radon–Nikodym theorem – Expressing a measure as an integral of another
- Riesz–Markov–Kakutani representation theorem – Statement about linear functionals and measures
- Ring of sets – Family closed under unions and relative complements
- σ-algebra – Algebraic structure of set algebra
- Vitali–Hahn–Saks theorem

== Notes ==
Proofs
