= Lebesgue's decomposition theorem =

Theorem in mathematical measure theory

In mathematics, more precisely in measure theory, the Lebesgue decomposition theorem provides a way to decompose a measure into two distinct parts based on their relationship with another measure.

== Formal Statement ==
The theorem states that if $(\Omega,\Sigma)$ is a measurable space and $\mu$ and $\nu$ are σ-finite signed measures on $\Sigma$, then there exist two uniquely determined σ-finite signed measures $\nu_0$ and $\nu_1$ such that:

- $\nu=\nu_0+\nu_1\,$
- $\nu_0\ll\mu$ (that is, $\nu_0$ is absolutely continuous with respect to $\mu$)
- $\nu_1\perp\mu$ (that is, $\nu_1$ and $\mu$ are singular).

=== Refinement ===
Lebesgue's decomposition theorem can be refined in a number of ways. First, as the Lebesgue–Radon–Nikodym theorem. That is, let $(\Omega,\Sigma)$ be a measure space, $\mu$ a σ-finite positive measure on $\Sigma$ and $\lambda$ a complex measure on $\Sigma$.

- There is a unique pair of complex measures on $\Sigma$ such that
  $$\lambda = \lambda_a + \lambda_s, \quad \lambda_a \ll \mu, \quad \lambda_s \perp \mu.$$
  If $\lambda$ is positive and finite, then so are $\lambda_a$ and $\lambda_s$.
- There is a unique $h \in L^1(\mu)$ such that
  $$\lambda_a (E) = \int_E h d\mu, \quad E \in \Sigma.$$

The first assertion follows from the Lebesgue decomposition, the second is known as the Radon–Nikodym theorem. That is, the function $h$ is a Radon–Nikodym derivative that can be expressed as
$$h = \frac{d\lambda_a}{d\mu}.$$

An alternative refinement is that of the decomposition of a regular Borel measure
$$\nu = \nu_{ac} + \nu_{sc} + \nu_{pp},$$
where

- $\nu_{ac} \ll \mu$ is the absolutely continuous part
- $\nu_{sc} \perp \mu$ is the singular continuous part
- $\nu_{pp}$ is the pure point part (a discrete measure).

The absolutely continuous measures are classified by the Radon–Nikodym theorem, and discrete measures are easily understood. Hence (singular continuous measures aside), Lebesgue decomposition gives a very explicit description of measures. The Cantor measure (the probability measure on the real line whose cumulative distribution function is the Cantor function) is an example of a singular continuous measure.

== Related concepts ==
=== Lévy–Itō decomposition ===
The analogous decomposition for a stochastic processes is the Lévy–Itō decomposition: given a Lévy process X, it can be decomposed as a sum of three independent Lévy processes $X=X^{(1)}+X^{(2)}+X^{(3)}$ where:

- $X^{(1)}$ is a Brownian motion with drift, corresponding to the absolutely continuous part;
- $X^{(2)}$ is a compound Poisson process, corresponding to the pure point part;
- $X^{(3)}$ is a square integrable pure jump martingale that almost surely has a countable number of jumps on a finite interval, corresponding to the singular continuous part.

== See also ==
- Decomposition of spectrum
- Hahn decomposition theorem and the corresponding Jordan decomposition theorem
- Spectrum (functional analysis) § Classification of points in the spectrum
- Spectral measure
