= Pentosin =

Global manufacturer of lubricants

Deutsche Pentosin-Werke GmbH
- Company type: GmbH (Limited Company)
- Industry: Lubricants, Automotive, Chemical
- Founded: Hamburg, Germany (1927)
- Founder: Heinrich Freudenthal
- Headquarters: Wedel, Schleswig-Holstein, Germany
- Key people: Mr. Jürgen Niemax, Managing Director
- Products: Lubricants, Speciality products
- Revenue: €135 million (2014)
- Number of employees: 190 (2015)
- Website: www.pentosin.com

Deutsche Pentosin-Werke GmbH, commonly known as Pentosin, is a global independent manufacturer of lubricants and related speciality products. The company was founded in 1927 at Hamburg, Germany. The current Pentosin headquarters are at Wedel in Schleswig-Holstein, not far from where the company had been founded.

The company philosophy is: "Quality and Continuity".

== History ==
In 1927, Heinrich Freudenthal formed a family-owned company, Deutsche Pentosin-Werke, creating veterinary and medical products. The high reputation of the products rapidly developed, and by 1935, the company was licensing the production of various Pentosin products in other countries, including Austria, the Czech Republic, Italy and Switzerland. The founder also recognised the need to supply the growing automotive markets, and started development of automotive lubricants and hydraulic brake fluids. Around this time, Freudenthal recognised that car makers initiated specific product approvals, and Pentosin progressed their research and development (R&D) in this direction. Pentosin were rewarded with approvals to supply the initial "factory fill", and with the resultant approvals, aftermarket sales progressed in a positive manner. From the outset, Freudenthal demanded a key objective of quality in all Pentosin products, and this stance still remains today.

By the 1960s, Pentosin had a "second wind", and the company enjoyed increased success. As product lines developed and increased, the company was starting to outgrow their current facilities, and so in 1960, started development of a new blending plant at Dormagen, North Rhine-Westphalia. In 1972, the company's original site in Hamburg was now too small, and so moved to a larger premises, a short distance up the river Elbe to their current location of Wedel.

In 2015, the company was bought by Fuchs Petrolub SE. Since then, the Pentosin brand continues to be sold alongside Fuchs branded products.

== Automotive products ==
Pentosin produces a wide range of high quality, "original equipment manufacturer" (OEM) specified products, as well as aftermarket products. These include automotive lubricants (engine motor oils, and transmission oils/fluids, for motor cars and motorcycles, including synthetic oils), industrial lubricants, and hydraulic products.

Pentosin products are supplied directly to many different automotive companies, including all marques of the Volkswagen Group, BMW, Daimler AG marques, Ford Motor Company, General Motors Europe and Porsche.

Pentosin FFL-2 is factory fill for the Volkswagen/Audi dual-clutch Direct-Shift Gearbox.

Pentosin FFL-4 is now being used in the new C8 Corvette dual clutch transmission.
