= Jordan decomposition =

In mathematics, Jordan decomposition may refer to

- Hahn decomposition theorem, and the Jordan decomposition of a measure
- Jordan normal form of a matrix
- Jordan–Chevalley decomposition of a matrix
- Deligne–Lusztig theory, and its Jordan decomposition of a character of a finite group of Lie type
- The Jordan–Hölder theorem, about decompositions of finite groups.
