= Complex measure =

Measure with complex values

In mathematics, specifically measure theory, a complex measure generalizes the concept of measure by letting it have complex values. In other words, one allows for sets whose size (length, area, volume) is a complex number.

== Definition ==
Formally, a complex measure $\mu$ on a measurable space $(X,\Sigma)$ is a complex-valued function

$$\mu: \Sigma \to \mathbb{C}$$

that is sigma-additive. In other words, for any sequence $(A_{n})_{n \in \mathbb{N}}$ of disjoint sets belonging to $\Sigma$, one has

$$\sum_{n = 1}^{\infty} \mu(A_{n}) = \mu \left( \bigcup_{n = 1}^{\infty} A_{n} \right) \in \mathbb{C}.$$

As $\displaystyle \bigcup_{n = 1}^{\infty} A_{n} = \bigcup_{n = 1}^{\infty} A_{\sigma(n)}$ for any permutation (bijection) $\sigma: \mathbb{N} \to \mathbb{N}$, it follows that $\displaystyle \sum_{n = 1}^{\infty} \mu(A_{n})$ converges unconditionally (hence, since $\mathbb{C}$ is finite dimensional, $\mu$ converges absolutely).

== Integration with respect to a complex measure ==
One can define the integral of a complex-valued measurable function with respect to a complex measure in the same way as the Lebesgue integral of a real-valued measurable function with respect to a non-negative measure, by approximating a measurable function with simple functions. Just as in the case of ordinary integration, this more general integral might fail to exist, or its value might be infinite (the complex infinity).

Another approach is to not develop a theory of integration from scratch, but rather use the already available concept of integral of a real-valued function with respect to a non-negative measure. To that end, it is a quick check that the real and imaginary parts μ_{1} and μ_{2} of a complex measure μ are finite-valued signed measures. One can apply the Hahn-Jordan decomposition to these measures to split them as

$$\mu_1=\mu_1^+-\mu_1^-$$

and

$$\mu_2=\mu_2^+-\mu_2^-$$

where μ_{1}^{+}, μ_{1}^{−}, μ_{2}^{+}, μ_{2}^{−} are finite-valued non-negative measures (which are unique in some sense). Then, for a measurable function f which is real-valued for the moment, one can define

$$\int_X \! f \, d\mu = \left(\int_X \! f \, d\mu_1^+ - \int_X \! f \, d\mu_1^-\right) + i \left(\int_X \! f \, d\mu_2^+ - \int_X \! f \, d\mu_2^-\right)$$

as long as the expression on the right-hand side is defined, that is, all four integrals exist and when adding them up one does not encounter the indeterminate ∞−∞.

Given now a complex-valued measurable function, one can integrate its real and imaginary components separately as illustrated above and define, as expected,

$$\int_X \! f \, d\mu = \int_X \! \Re(f) \, d\mu + i \int_X \! \Im(f) \, d\mu.$$

== Variation of a complex measure and polar decomposition ==
For a complex measure μ, one defines its variation, or absolute value, |μ| by the formula

$$|\mu|(A)= \sup\sum_{n=1}^\infty |\mu(A_n)|$$

where A is in Σ and the supremum runs over all sequences of disjoint sets (A_{n})_{n} whose union is A. Taking only finite partitions of the set A into measurable subsets, one obtains an equivalent definition.

It turns out that |μ| is a non-negative finite measure. In the same way as a complex number can be represented in a polar form, one has a polar decomposition for a complex measure: There exists a measurable function θ with real values such that

$$d\mu = e ^{i \theta}d |\mu|,$$

meaning

$$\int_X f\, d\mu = \int_X  f e ^{i \theta} \, d |\mu|$$

for any absolutely integrable measurable function f, i.e., f satisfying

$$\int_X |f|\, d|\mu|<\infty.$$

One can use the Radon–Nikodym theorem to prove that the variation is a measure and the existence of the polar decomposition.

== The space of complex measures ==
The sum of two complex measures is a complex measure, as is the product of a complex measure by a complex number. That is to say, the set of all complex measures on a measure space (X, Σ) forms a vector space over the complex numbers. Moreover, the total variation $\|\cdot\|$ defined as

$$\|\mu\| = |\mu| (X)\,$$

is a norm, with respect to which the space of complex measures is a Banach space.

== See also ==
- Riesz representation theorem
- Signed measure
- Vector measure
