= Positive and negative sets =

Concept in measure theory

In measure theory, given a measurable space $(X, \Sigma)$ and a signed measure $\mu$ on it, a set $A \in \Sigma$ is called a positive set for $\mu$ if every $\Sigma$-measurable subset of $A$ has nonnegative measure; that is, for every $E \subseteq A$ that satisfies $E \in \Sigma,$ $\mu(E) \geq 0$ holds.

Similarly, a set $A \in \Sigma$ is called a negative set for $\mu$ if for every subset $E \subseteq A$ satisfying $E \in \Sigma,$ $\mu(E) \leq 0$ holds.

Intuitively, a measurable set $A$ is positive (resp. negative) for $\mu$ if $\mu$ is nonnegative (resp. nonpositive) everywhere on $A.$ Of course, if $\mu$ is a nonnegative measure, every element of $\Sigma$ is a positive set for $\mu.$

In the light of Radon–Nikodym theorem, if $\nu$ is a σ-finite positive measure such that $|\mu| \ll \nu,$ a set $A$ is a positive set for $\mu$ if and only if the Radon–Nikodym derivative $d\mu/d\nu$ is nonnegative $\nu$-almost everywhere on $A.$ Similarly, a negative set is a set where $d\mu/d\nu \leq 0$ $\nu$-almost everywhere.

== Properties ==
It follows from the definition that every measurable subset of a positive or negative set is also positive or negative. Also, the union of a sequence of positive or negative sets is also positive or negative; more formally, if $A_1, A_2, \ldots$ is a sequence of positive sets, then
$$\bigcup_{n=1}^\infty A_n$$
is also a positive set; the same is true if the word "positive" is replaced by "negative".

A set which is both positive and negative is a $\mu$-null set, for if $E$ is a measurable subset of a positive and negative set $A,$ then both $\mu(E) \geq 0$ and $\mu(E) \leq 0$ must hold, and therefore, $\mu(E) = 0.$

== Hahn decomposition ==
The Hahn decomposition theorem states that for every measurable space $(X, \Sigma)$ with a signed measure $\mu,$ there is a partition of $X$ into a positive and a negative set; such a partition $(P, N)$ is unique up to $\mu$-null sets, and is called a Hahn decomposition of the signed measure $\mu.$

Given a Hahn decomposition $(P, N)$ of $X,$ it is easy to show that $A \subseteq X$ is a positive set if and only if $A$ differs from a subset of $P$ by a $\mu$-null set; equivalently, if $A \smallsetminus P$ is $\mu$-null. The same is true for negative sets, if $N$ is used instead of $P.$

== See also ==
- Set function – Function from sets to numbers
