= Freudenthal spectral theorem =

In mathematics, the Freudenthal spectral theorem is a result in Riesz space theory proved by Hans Freudenthal in 1936. It roughly states that any element dominated by a positive element in a Riesz space with the principal projection property can in a sense be approximated uniformly by simple functions.

Numerous well-known results may be derived from the Freudenthal spectral theorem. The well-known Radon–Nikodym theorem, the validity of the Poisson formula and the spectral theorem from the theory of normal operators can all be shown to follow as special cases of the Freudenthal spectral theorem.

== Statement ==
Let e be any positive element in a Riesz space E. A positive element of p in E is called a component of e if $p\wedge(e-p)=0$. If $p_1,p_2,\ldots,p_n$ are pairwise disjoint components of e, any real linear combination of $p_1,p_2,\ldots,p_n$ is called an e-simple function.

The Freudenthal spectral theorem states: Let E be any Riesz space with the principal projection property and e any positive element in E. Then for any element f in the principal ideal generated by e, there exist sequences $\{s_n\}$ and $\{t_n\}$ of e-simple functions, such that $\{s_n\}$ is monotone increasing and converges e-uniformly to f, and $\{t_n\}$ is monotone decreasing and converges e-uniformly to f.

== Relation to the Radon–Nikodym theorem ==
Let $(X,\Sigma)$ be a measure space and $M_\sigma$ the real space of signed $\sigma$-additive measures on $(X,\Sigma)$. It can be shown that $M_\sigma$ is a Dedekind complete Banach Lattice with the total variation norm, and hence has the principal projection property. For any positive measure $\mu$, $\mu$-simple functions (as defined above) can be shown to correspond exactly to $\mu$-measurable simple functions on $(X,\Sigma)$ (in the usual sense). Moreover, since by the Freudenthal spectral theorem, any measure $\nu$ in the band generated by $\mu$ can be monotonously approximated from below by $\mu$-measurable simple functions on $(X,\Sigma)$, by Lebesgue's monotone convergence theorem $\nu$ can be shown to correspond to an $L^1(X,\Sigma,\mu)$ function and establishes an isometric lattice isomorphism between the band generated by $\mu$ and the Banach Lattice $L^1(X,\Sigma,\mu)$.

== See also ==
- Radon–Nikodym theorem
