= Tau additivity =

Property of certain measures on topological spaces

In mathematics, in the field of measure theory, τ-additivity is a certain property of measures on topological spaces.

A measure or set function $\mu$ on a space $X$ whose domain is a sigma-algebra $\Sigma$ is said to be τ-additive if for any upward-directed family $\mathcal{G} \subseteq \Sigma$ of nonempty open sets such that its union is in $\Sigma,$ the measure of the union is the supremum of measures of elements of $\mathcal{G};$ that is,:
$$\mu\left(\bigcup \mathcal{G}\right) = \sup_{G\in\mathcal{G}} \mu(G).$$

== See also ==
- Net (mathematics) – Generalization of a sequence of points
- Sigma additivity – Mapping function
- Valuation (measure theory)
