= Freudenthal =

Freudenthal is a German surname. Notable people with the surname include:

- Axel Olof Freudenthal (1836–1911), Finland-Swedish philologist and politician
- Dave Freudenthal (born 1950), American politician
- Franz Freudenthal, Bolivian physician
- Hans Freudenthal (1905–1990), Dutch mathematician
- Jacob Freudenthal (1839–1907), German philosopher
- Karl Freudenthal (1907–1944), Nazi lawyer and SS officer
- Nancy D. Freudenthal (born 1954), U.S. district judge
- Steve Freudenthal (born 1949), American politician
- Thor Freudenthal (born 1972), American director and screenwriter

== See also ==
- Nathan Freudenthal Leopold Jr. (1904–1971), American criminal
- 9689 Freudenthal, asteroid
- Bruntál, town in the Czech Republic, known in German as Freudenthal
- Freudenthal spectral theorem
- Freudenthal suspension theorem
