= Hadwiger's theorem =

Theorem in integral geometry

In integral geometry (otherwise called geometric probability theory), Hadwiger's theorem characterises the valuations on convex bodies in $\R^n.$ It was proved by Hugo Hadwiger.

== Introduction ==
=== Valuations ===
Let $\mathbb{K}^n$ be the collection of all compact convex sets in $\R^n.$ A valuation is a function $v : \mathbb{K}^n \to \R$ such that $v(\varnothing) = 0$ and for every $S, T \in \mathbb{K}^n$ that satisfy $S \cup T \in \mathbb{K}^n,$ $v(S) + v(T) = v(S \cap T) + v(S \cup T)~.$

A valuation is called continuous if it is continuous with respect to the Hausdorff metric. A valuation is called invariant under rigid motions if $v(\varphi(S)) = v(S)$ whenever $S \in \mathbb{K}^n$ and $\varphi$ is either a translation or a rotation of $\R^n.$

=== Quermassintegrals ===
The quermassintegrals $W_j : \mathbb{K}^n \to \R$ are defined via Steiner's formula $\mathrm{Vol}_n(K + t B) = \sum_{j=0}^n \binom{n}{j} W_j(K) t^j~,$ where $B$ is the Euclidean ball. For example, $W_0$ is the volume, $W_1$ is proportional to the surface measure, $W_{n-1}$ is proportional to the mean width, and $W_n$ is the constant $\operatorname{Vol}_n(B).$

$W_j$ is a valuation which is homogeneous of degree $n - j,$ that is, $W_j(tK) = t^{n-j} W_j(K)~, \quad t \geq 0~.$

== Statement ==
Any continuous valuation $v$ on $\mathbb{K}^n$ that is invariant under rigid motions can be represented as $v(S) = \sum_{j=0}^n c_j W_j(S)~.$

=== Corollary ===
Any continuous valuation $v$ on $\mathbb{K}^n$ that is invariant under rigid motions and homogeneous of degree $j$ is a multiple of $W_{n-j}.$

== See also ==
- Minkowski functional – Function made from a set
- Set function – Function from sets to numbers
