= Valuation (measure theory) =

In measure theory, or at least in the approach to it via the domain theory, a valuation is a map from the class of open sets of a topological space to the set of positive real numbers including infinity, with certain properties. It is a concept closely related to that of a measure, and as such, it finds applications in measure theory, probability theory, and theoretical computer science.

== Domain/Measure theory definition ==
Let $\scriptstyle (X,\mathcal{T})$ be a topological space: a valuation is any set function
$$v : \mathcal{T} \to \R^+ \cup \{+\infty\}$$
satisfying the following three properties
$$\begin{array}{lll}
v(\varnothing) = 0 & & \scriptstyle{\text{Strictness property}}\\
v(U)\leq v(V) & \mbox{if}~U\subseteq V\quad U,V\in\mathcal{T} & \scriptstyle{\text{Monotonicity property}}\\
v(U\cup V)+ v(U\cap V) = v(U)+v(V) & \forall U,V\in\mathcal{T} & \scriptstyle{\text{Modularity property}}\,
\end{array}$$

The definition immediately shows the relationship between a valuation and a measure: the properties of the two mathematical object are often very similar if not identical, the only difference being that the domain of a measure is the Borel algebra of the given topological space, while the domain of a valuation is the class of open sets. Further details and references can be found in Alvarez-Manilla, Edalat & Saheb-Djahromi 2000 and Goubault-Larrecq 2005.

=== Continuous valuation ===
A valuation (as defined in domain theory/measure theory) is said to be continuous if for every directed family $\scriptstyle \{U_i\}_{i\in I}$ of open sets (i.e. an indexed family of open sets which is also directed in the sense that for each pair of indexes $i$ and $j$ belonging to the index set $I$, there exists an index $k$ such that $\scriptstyle U_i\subseteq U_k$ and $\scriptstyle U_j\subseteq U_k$) the following equality holds:
$$v\left(\bigcup_{i\in I}U_i\right) = \sup_{i\in I} v(U_i).$$

This property is analogous to the τ-additivity of measures.

=== Simple valuation ===
A valuation (as defined in domain theory/measure theory) is said to be simple if it is a finite linear combination with non-negative coefficients of Dirac valuations, that is,
$$v(U)=\sum_{i=1}^n a_i\delta_{x_i}(U)\quad\forall U\in\mathcal{T}$$
where $a_i$ is nonnegative for all $i$. Simple valuations are obviously continuous in the above sense. The supremum of a directed family of simple valuations (i.e. an indexed family of simple valuations which is also directed in the sense that for each pair of indexes $i$ and $j$ belonging to the index set $I$, there exists an index $k$ such that $\scriptstyle v_i(U)\leq v_k(U)\!$ and $\scriptstyle v_j(U)\leq v_k(U)\!$) is called quasi-simple valuation
$$\bar{v}(U) = \sup_{i\in I}v_i(U) \quad \forall U\in \mathcal{T}.\,$$

=== See also ===
- The extension problem for a given valuation (in the sense of domain theory/measure theory) consists in finding under what type of conditions it can be extended to a measure on a proper topological space, which may or may not be the same space where it is defined: the papers Alvarez-Manilla, Edalat & Saheb-Djahromi 2000 and Goubault-Larrecq 2005 in the reference section are devoted to this aim and give also several historical details.
- The concepts of valuation on convex sets and valuation on manifolds are a generalization of valuation in the sense of domain/measure theory. A valuation on convex sets is allowed to assume complex values, and the underlying topological space is the set of non-empty convex compact subsets of a finite-dimensional vector space: a valuation on manifolds is a complex valued finitely additive measure defined on a proper subset of the class of all compact submanifolds of the given manifolds. (Note: Details can be found in several arXiv papers of prof. Semyon Alesker.)

== Examples ==
=== Dirac valuation ===
Let $\scriptstyle (X,\mathcal{T})$ be a topological space, and let $x$ be a point of $X$: the map
$$\delta_x(U)=
\begin{cases}
0 & \mbox{if}~x\notin U\\
1 & \mbox{if}~x\in U
\end{cases}
\quad \text{ for all } U \in \mathcal{T}$$
is a valuation in the domain theory/measure theory, sense called Dirac valuation. This concept bears its origin from distribution theory as it is an obvious transposition to valuation theory of Dirac distribution: as seen above, Dirac valuations are the "bricks" simple valuations are made of.

== See also ==
- Valuation (geometry)

== Works cited ==
- Alvarez-Manilla, Maurizio; Edalat, Abbas; Saheb-Djahromi, Nasser (2000), "An extension result for continuous valuations", Journal of the London Mathematical Society, 61 (2): 629–640, doi:10.1112/S0024610700008681.
- Goubault-Larrecq, Jean (2005), "Extensions of valuations", Mathematical Structures in Computer Science, 15 (2): 271–297, doi:10.1017/S096012950400461X
