= Signed measure =

Generalized notion of measure in mathematics

In mathematics, a signed measure is a generalization of the concept of (positive) measure by allowing the set function to take negative values, i.e., to acquire sign.

== Definition ==
There are two slightly different concepts of a signed measure, depending on whether or not one allows it to take infinite values. Signed measures are usually only allowed to take finite real values, while some textbooks allow them to take infinite values. To avoid confusion, this article will call these two cases "finite signed measures" and "extended signed measures".

Given a measurable space $(X, \Sigma)$ (that is, a set $X$ with a σ-algebra $\Sigma$ on it), an extended signed measure is a set function
$$\mu : \Sigma \to \R \cup \{\infty,-\infty\}$$
such that $\mu(\varnothing) = 0$ and $\mu$ is σ-additive – that is, it satisfies the equality
$$\mu\left(\bigcup_{n=1}^\infty A_n\right) = \sum_{n=1}^\infty \mu(A_n)$$
for any sequence $A_1, A_2, \ldots, A_n, \ldots$ of disjoint sets in $\Sigma.$ The series on the right must converge absolutely when the value of the left-hand side is finite. One consequence is that an extended signed measure can take $+\infty$ or $-\infty$ as a value, but not both. The expression $\infty - \infty$ is undefined and must be avoided.

A finite signed measure (a.k.a. real measure) is defined in the same way, except that it is only allowed to take real values. That is, it cannot take $+\infty$ or $-\infty.$

Finite signed measures form a real vector space, while extended signed measures do not because they are not closed under addition. On the other hand, measures are extended signed measures, but are not in general finite signed measures.

== Examples ==
Consider a non-negative measure $\nu$ on the space (X, Σ) and a measurable function f: X → R such that

$$\int_X \! |f(x)| \, d\nu (x) < \infty.$$

Then, a finite signed measure is given by

$$\mu (A) = \int_A \! f(x) \, d\nu (x)$$

for all A in Σ.

This signed measure takes only finite values. To allow it to take +∞ as a value, one needs to replace the assumption about f being absolutely integrable with the more relaxed condition

$$\int_X \! f^-(x) \, d\nu (x) < \infty,$$

where f^{−}(x) = max(−f(x), 0) is the negative part of f.

== Properties ==
What follows are two results which will imply that an extended signed measure is the difference of two non-negative measures, and a finite signed measure is the difference of two finite non-negative measures.

The Hahn decomposition theorem states that given a signed measure μ, there exist two measurable sets P and N such that:

1. P∪N = X and P∩N = ∅;
2. μ(E) ≥ 0 for each E in Σ such that E ⊆ P — in other words, P is a positive set;
3. μ(E) ≤ 0 for each E in Σ such that E ⊆ N — that is, N is a negative set.

Moreover, this decomposition is unique up to adding to/subtracting μ-null sets from P and N.

Consider then two non-negative measures μ^{+} and μ^{−} defined by

$$\mu^+(E) = \mu(P\cap E)$$

and

$$\mu^-(E)=-\mu(N\cap E)$$

for all measurable sets E, that is, E in Σ.

One can check that both μ^{+} and μ^{−} are non-negative measures, with one taking only finite values, and are called the positive part and negative part of μ, respectively. One has that μ = μ^{+} − μ^{−}. The measure |μ| = μ^{+} + μ^{−} is called the variation of μ, and its maximum possible value, ||μ|| = |μ|(X), is called the total variation of μ.

This consequence of the Hahn decomposition theorem is called the Jordan decomposition. The measures μ^{+}, μ^{−} and |μ| are independent of the choice of P and N in the Hahn decomposition theorem.

== The space of signed measures ==
The sum of two finite signed measures is a finite signed measure, as is the product of a finite signed measure by a real number – that is, they are closed under linear combinations. It follows that the set of finite signed measures on a measurable space (X, Σ) is a real vector space; this is in contrast to positive measures, which are only closed under conical combinations, and thus form a convex cone but not a vector space. Furthermore, the total variation defines a norm in respect to which the space of finite signed measures becomes a Banach space. This space has even more structure, in that it can be shown to be a Dedekind complete Banach lattice and in so doing the Radon–Nikodym theorem can be shown to be a special case of the Freudenthal spectral theorem.

If X is a compact separable space, then the space of finite signed Baire measures is the dual of the real Banach space of all continuous real-valued functions on X, by the Riesz–Markov–Kakutani representation theorem.

== See also ==
- Angular displacement
- Complex measure
- Spectral measure
- Vector measure
- Riesz–Markov–Kakutani representation theorem
- Signed arc length
- Signed area
- Signed distance
- Signed volume
- Total variation
