= Sigma-additive set function =

Mapping function

In mathematics, an additive set function is a function $\mu$ mapping sets to numbers, with the property that its value on a union of two disjoint sets equals the sum of its values on these sets, namely, $\mu(A \cup B) = \mu(A) + \mu(B).$ If this additivity property holds for any two sets, then it also holds for any finite number of sets, namely, the function value on the union of k disjoint sets (where k is a finite number) equals the sum of its values on the sets. Therefore, an additive set function is also called a finitely additive set function (the terms are equivalent). However, a finitely additive set function might not have the additivity property for a union of an infinite number of sets. A σ-additive set function is a function that has the additivity property even for countably infinite many sets, that is, $\mu\left(\bigcup_{n=1}^\infty A_n\right) = \sum_{n=1}^\infty \mu(A_n).$

Additivity and sigma-additivity are particularly important properties of measures. They are abstractions of how intuitive properties of size (length, area, volume) of a set sum when considering multiple objects. Additivity is a weaker condition than σ-additivity; that is, σ-additivity implies additivity.

The term modular set function is equivalent to additive set function; see modularity below.

== Additive (or finitely additive) set functions ==
Let $\mu$ be a set function defined on an algebra of sets $\scriptstyle\mathcal{A}$ with values in $[-\infty, \infty]$ (see the extended real number line). The function $\mu$ is called additive or finitely additive, if whenever $A$ and $B$ are disjoint sets in $\scriptstyle\mathcal{A},$ then
$$\mu(A \cup B) = \mu(A) + \mu(B).$$
A consequence of this is that an additive function cannot take both $- \infty$ and $+ \infty$ as values, for the expression $\infty - \infty$ is undefined.

One can prove by mathematical induction that an additive function satisfies
$$\mu\left(\bigcup_{n=1}^N A_n\right)=\sum_{n=1}^N \mu\left(A_n\right)$$
for any $A_1, A_2, \ldots, A_N$ disjoint sets in $\mathcal{A}.$

== σ-additive set functions ==
Suppose that $\scriptstyle\mathcal{A}$ is a σ-algebra. If for every sequence $A_1, A_2, \ldots, A_n, \ldots$ of pairwise disjoint sets in $\scriptstyle\mathcal{A},$
$$\mu\left(\bigcup_{n=1}^\infty A_n\right) = \sum_{n=1}^\infty \mu(A_n),$$
holds then $\mu$ is said to be countably additive or 𝜎-additive. Every 𝜎-additive function is additive but not vice versa, as shown below.

== τ-additive set functions ==
Suppose that in addition to a sigma algebra $\mathcal{A},$ we have a topology $\tau.$ If for every directed family of measurable open sets $\mathcal{G} \subseteq \mathcal{A} \cap \tau,$
$$\mu\left(\bigcup \mathcal{G} \right) = \sup_{G\in\mathcal{G}} \mu(G),$$
we say that $\mu$ is $\tau$-additive. In particular, if $\mu$ is inner regular (with respect to compact sets) then it is $\tau$-additive.

== Properties ==
Useful properties of an additive set function $\mu$ include the following.

=== Value of empty set ===
Either $\mu(\varnothing) = 0,$ or $\mu$ assigns $\infty$ to all sets in its domain, or $\mu$ assigns $- \infty$ to all sets in its domain. Proof: additivity implies that for every set $A,$ $\mu(A) = \mu(A \cup \varnothing) = \mu(A) + \mu( \varnothing)$ (it's possible in the edge case of an empty domain that the only choice for $A$ is the empty set itself, but that still works). If $\mu(\varnothing) \neq 0,$ then this equality can be satisfied only by plus or minus infinity.

=== Monotonicity ===
If $\mu$ is non-negative and $A \subseteq B$ then $\mu(A) \leq \mu(B).$ That is, $\mu$ is a monotone set function. Similarly, If $\mu$ is non-positive and $A \subseteq B$ then $\mu(A) \geq \mu(B).$

=== Modularity ===
A set function $\mu$ on a family of sets $\mathcal{S}$ is called a modular set function and a valuation if whenever $A,$ $B,$ $A\cup B,$ and $A\cap B$ are elements of $\mathcal{S},$ then
$$\mu(A\cup B)+  \mu(A\cap B) = \mu(A) + \mu(B)$$
The above property is called modularity and the argument below proves that additivity implies modularity.

Given $A$ and $B,$ $\mu(A \cup B) + \mu(A \cap B) = \mu(A) + \mu(B).$ Proof: write $A = (A \cap B) \cup (A \setminus B)$ and $B = (A \cap B) \cup (B \setminus A)$ and $A \cup B = (A \cap B) \cup (A \setminus B) \cup (B \setminus A),$ where all sets in the union are disjoint. Additivity implies that both sides of the equality equal $\mu(A \setminus B) + \mu(B \setminus A) + 2\mu(A \cap B).$

However, the related properties of submodularity and subadditivity are not equivalent to each other.

Note that modularity has a different and unrelated meaning in the context of complex functions; see modular form.

=== Set difference ===
If $A \subseteq B$ and $\mu(B) - \mu(A)$ is defined, then $\mu(B \setminus A) = \mu(B) - \mu(A).$

== Examples ==
An example of a 𝜎-additive function is the function $\mu$ defined over the power set of the real numbers, such that
$$\mu (A)= \begin{cases} 1 & \mbox{ if } 0 \in A \\
0 & \mbox{ if } 0 \notin A.
\end{cases}$$

If $A_1, A_2, \ldots, A_n, \ldots$ is a sequence of disjoint sets of real numbers, then either none of the sets contains 0, or precisely one of them does. In either case, the equality
$$\mu\left(\bigcup_{n=1}^\infty A_n\right) = \sum_{n=1}^\infty \mu(A_n)$$
holds.

See measure and signed measure for more examples of 𝜎-additive functions.

A charge is defined to be a finitely additive set function that maps $\varnothing$ to $0.$ (Cf. ba space for information about bounded charges, where we say a charge is bounded to mean its range is a bounded subset of R.)

=== An additive function which is not σ-additive ===
An example of an additive function which is not σ-additive is obtained by considering $\mu$, defined over the Lebesgue sets of the real numbers $\R$ by the formula
$$\mu(A) = \lim_{k\to\infty} \frac{1}{k} \cdot \lambda(A \cap (0,k)),$$
where $\lambda$ denotes the Lebesgue measure and $\lim$ the Banach limit. It satisfies $0 \leq \mu(A) \leq 1$ and if $\sup A < \infty$ then $\mu(A) = 0.$

One can check that this function is additive by using the linearity of the limit. That this function is not σ-additive follows by considering the sequence of disjoint sets
$$A_n = [n,n + 1)$$
for $n = 0, 1, 2, \ldots$ The union of these sets is the positive reals, and $\mu$ applied to the union is then one, while $\mu$ applied to any of the individual sets is zero, so the sum of $\mu(A_n)$ is also zero, which proves the counterexample.

== Generalizations ==
One may define additive functions with values in any additive monoid (for example any group or more commonly a vector space). For sigma-additivity, one needs in addition that the concept of limit of a sequence be defined on that set. For example, spectral measures are sigma-additive functions with values in a Banach algebra. Another example, also from quantum mechanics, is the positive operator-valued measure.

== See also ==
- Additive map – Z-module homomorphism
- Hahn–Kolmogorov theorem – Theorem extending pre-measures to measures
- Measure (mathematics) – Generalization of mass, length, area and volume
- σ-finite measure – Concept in measure theory
- Signed measure – Generalized notion of measure in mathematics
- Submodular set function – Set-to-real map with diminishing returns
- Subadditive set function
- τ-additivity – Property of certain measures on topological spaces
- ba space – The set of bounded charges on a given sigma-algebra
