= Hahn decomposition theorem =

Measurability theorem

In mathematics, the Hahn decomposition theorem, named after the Austrian mathematician Hans Hahn, states that for any measurable space $(X,\Sigma)$ and any signed measure $\mu$ defined on the $\sigma$-algebra $\Sigma$, there exist two $\Sigma$-measurable sets, $P$ and $N$, of $X$ such that:

1. $P \cup N = X$ and $P \cap N = \varnothing$.
2. For every $E \in \Sigma$ such that $E \subseteq P$, one has $\mu(E) \geq 0$, i.e., $P$ is a positive set for $\mu$.
3. For every $E \in \Sigma$ such that $E \subseteq N$, one has $\mu(E) \leq 0$, i.e., $N$ is a negative set for $\mu$.

Moreover, this decomposition is essentially unique, meaning that for any other pair $(P',N')$ of $\Sigma$-measurable subsets of $X$ fulfilling the three conditions above, the symmetric differences $P \triangle P'$ and $N \triangle N'$ are $\mu$-null sets in the strong sense that every $\Sigma$-measurable subset of them has zero measure. The pair $(P,N)$ is then called a Hahn decomposition of the signed measure $\mu$.

== Jordan measure decomposition ==
A consequence of the Hahn decomposition theorem is the Jordan decomposition theorem, which states that every signed measure $\mu$ defined on $\Sigma$ has a unique decomposition into the difference $\mu = \mu^{+} - \mu^{-}$ of two positive measures, $\mu^{+}$ and $\mu^{-}$, at least one of which is finite, such that ${\mu^{+}}(E) = 0$ for every $\Sigma$-measurable subset $E \subseteq N$ and ${\mu^{-}}(E) = 0$ for every $\Sigma$-measurable subset $E \subseteq P$, for any Hahn decomposition $(P,N)$ of $\mu$. We call $\mu^{+}$ and $\mu^{-}$ the positive and negative part of $\mu$, respectively. The pair $(\mu^{+},\mu^{-})$ is called a Jordan decomposition (or sometimes Hahn–Jordan decomposition) of $\mu$. The two measures can be defined as

$${\mu^{+}}(E) := \mu(E \cap P) \qquad \text{and} \qquad {\mu^{-}}(E) := - \mu(E \cap N)$$

for every $E \in \Sigma$ and any Hahn decomposition $(P,N)$ of $\mu$.

Note that the Jordan decomposition is unique, while the Hahn decomposition is only essentially unique.

The Jordan decomposition has the following corollary: Given a Jordan decomposition $(\mu^{+},\mu^{-})$ of a finite signed measure $\mu$, one has

$${\mu^{+}}(E) = \sup_{B \in \Sigma, ~ B \subseteq E} \mu(B) \quad \text{and} \quad {\mu^{-}}(E) = - \inf_{B \in \Sigma, ~ B \subseteq E} \mu(B)$$

for any $E$ in $\Sigma$. Furthermore, if $\mu = \nu^{+} - \nu^{-}$ for a pair $(\nu^{+},\nu^{-})$ of finite non-negative measures on $X$, then

$$\nu^{+} \geq \mu^{+} \quad \text{and} \quad \nu^{-} \geq \mu^{-}.$$

The last expression means that the Jordan decomposition is the minimal decomposition of $\mu$ into the difference of non-negative measures. This is the minimality property of the Jordan decomposition.

Proof of the Jordan decomposition: For an elementary proof of the existence, uniqueness, and minimality of the Jordan measure decomposition see Fischer (2012).

== Proof of the Hahn decomposition theorem ==
Preparation: Assume that $\mu$ does not take the value $- \infty$ (otherwise decompose according to $- \mu$). As mentioned above, a negative set is a set $A \in \Sigma$ such that $\mu(B) \leq 0$ for every $\Sigma$-measurable subset $B \subseteq A$.

Claim: Suppose that $D \in \Sigma$ satisfies $\mu(D) \leq 0$. Then there is a negative set $A \subseteq D$ such that $\mu(A) \leq \mu(D)$.

Proof of the claim: Define $A_{0} := D$. Inductively assume for $n \in \mathbb{N}_{0}$ that $A_{n} \subseteq D$ has been constructed. Let

$$t_{n} := \sup(\{ \mu(B) \mid B \in \Sigma ~ \text{and} ~ B \subseteq A_{n} \})$$

denote the supremum of $\mu(B)$ over all the $\Sigma$-measurable subsets $B$ of $A_{n}$. This supremum might a priori be infinite. As the empty set $\varnothing$ is a possible candidate for $B$ in the definition of $t_{n}$, and as $\mu(\varnothing) = 0$, we have $t_{n} \geq 0$. By the definition of $t_{n}$, there then exists a $\Sigma$-measurable subset $B_{n} \subseteq A_{n}$ satisfying

$$\mu(B_{n}) \geq \min \! \left( 1,\frac{t_{n}}{2} \right).$$

Set $A_{n + 1} := A_{n} \setminus B_{n}$ to finish the induction step. Finally, define

$$A := D \Bigg\backslash \bigcup_{n = 0}^{\infty}  B_{n}.$$

As the sets $(B_{n})_{n = 0}^{\infty}$ are disjoint subsets of $D$, it follows from the sigma additivity of the signed measure $\mu$ that

$$\mu(D) = \mu(A) + \sum_{n = 0}^{\infty} \mu(B_{n}) \geq \mu(A) + \sum_{n = 0}^{\infty} \min \! \left( 1,\frac{t_{n}}{2} \right)\geq \mu(A).$$

This shows that $\mu(A) \leq \mu(D)$. Assume $A$ were not a negative set. This means that there would exist a $\Sigma$-measurable subset $B \subseteq A$ that satisfies $\mu(B) > 0$. Then $t_{n} \geq \mu(B)$ for every $n \in \mathbb{N}_{0}$, so the series on the right would have to diverge to $+ \infty$, implying that $\mu(D) = + \infty$, which is a contradiction, since $\mu(D) \leq 0$. Therefore, $A$ must be a negative set.

Construction of the decomposition: Set $N_{0} = \varnothing$. Inductively, given $N_{n}$, define

$$s_{n} := \inf(\{ \mu(D) \mid D \in \Sigma ~ \text{and} ~ D \subseteq X \setminus N_{n} \}).$$

as the infimum of $\mu(D)$ over all the $\Sigma$-measurable subsets $D$ of $X \setminus N_{n}$. This infimum might a priori be $- \infty$. As $\varnothing$ is a possible candidate for $D$ in the definition of $s_{n}$, and as $\mu(\varnothing) = 0$, we have $s_{n} \leq 0$. Hence, there exists a $\Sigma$-measurable subset $D_{n} \subseteq X \setminus N_{n}$ such that

$$\mu(D_{n}) \leq \max \! \left( \frac{s_{n}}{2},- 1 \right) \leq 0.$$

By the claim above, there is a negative set $A_{n} \subseteq D_{n}$ such that $\mu(A_{n}) \leq \mu(D_{n})$. Set $N_{n + 1} := N_{n} \cup A_{n}$ to finish the induction step. Finally, define

$$N := \bigcup_{n = 0}^{\infty} A_{n}.$$

As the sets $(A_{n})_{n = 0}^{\infty}$ are disjoint, we have for every $\Sigma$-measurable subset $B \subseteq N$ that

$$\mu(B) = \sum_{n = 0}^{\infty} \mu(B \cap A_{n})$$

by the sigma additivity of $\mu$. In particular, this shows that $N$ is a negative set. Next, define $P := X \setminus N$. If $P$ were not a positive set, there would exist a $\Sigma$-measurable subset $D \subseteq P$ with $\mu(D) < 0$. Then $s_{n} \leq \mu(D)$ for all $n \in \mathbb{N}_{0}$ and

$$\mu(N) = \sum_{n = 0}^{\infty} \mu(A_{n}) \leq \sum_{n = 0}^{\infty} \max \! \left( \frac{s_{n}}{2},- 1 \right) = - \infty,$$

which is not allowed for $\mu$. Therefore, $P$ is a positive set.

Proof of the uniqueness statement: Suppose that $(N',P')$ is another Hahn decomposition of $X$. Then $P \cap N'$ is a positive set and also a negative set. Therefore, every measurable subset of it has measure zero. The same applies to $N \cap P'$. As

$$P \triangle P' = N \triangle N' = (P \cap N') \cup (N \cap P'),$$

this completes the proof. Q.E.D.

== See also ==
Lebesgue's decomposition theorem
