= Jules Tannery =

French mathematician (1848–1910)

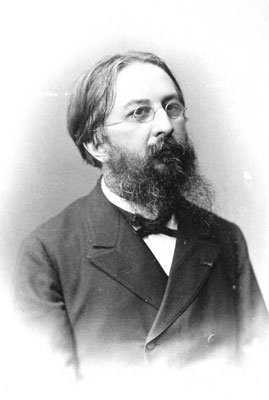
- Jules Tannery (1848-1910). Photo by A. Gerschel & Sons (c. 1866).
- Born: 24 March 1848; Mantes-sur-Seine, France
- Died: 11 December 1910 (aged 62); Paris, France
- Education: École Normale Supérieure
- Scientific career
- Fields: Mathematician
- Workplaces: École Normale Supérieure; Université de Paris; Sorbonne
- Thesis: Propriétés des intégrales des équations différentielles linéaires à coefficients variables (1874)
- Doctoral advisor: Charles Hermite
- Doctoral students: Albert Châtelet; Jacques Hadamard

Notes
- Brother of Paul Tannery

Jules Tannery (24 March 1848 – 11 December 1910) was a French mathematician, who notably studied under Charles Hermite and was the PhD advisor of Jacques Hadamard. Tannery's theorem on interchange of limits and series is named after him. He was a brother of the mathematician and historian of science Paul Tannery.

== Career ==
Under Hermite, he received a doctorate in 1874 for his thesis Propriétés des intégrales des équations différentielles linéaires à coefficients variables.

Tannery was an advocate for mathematics education, particular as a means to train children in logical consequence through synthetic geometry and mathematical proofs.

Tannery discovered a surface of the fourth order of which all the geodesic lines are algebraic. He was not an inventor, however, but essentially a critic and methodologist. He once remarked, "Mathematicians are so used to their symbols and have so much fun playing with them, that it is sometimes necessary to take their toys away from them in order to oblige them to think."

He notably influenced Pierre Duhem, Paul Painlevé, Jules Drach, and Émile Borel to take up science.

His efforts were mainly directed to the study of the mathematical foundations and of the philosophical ideas implied in mathematical thinking. Tannery was "an original thinker, a successful teacher, and a writer endowed with an unusually clear, brilliant and attractive style."

== Works ==
- 1894: Leçons sur l'Arithmétique théorique et pratique, Armand Colin & Cie, via Internet Archive
- Rôle du nombre dans les sciences
- 1893: (in French) J. Tannery and J. Molk Eléments de la théorie des fonctions elliptiques. Tome I, Introduction. Calcul différentiel. Ire partie (Paris : Gauthier-Villars et fils)
- 1893: (in French) J. Tannery and J. Molk Eléments de la théorie des fonctions elliptiques. Tome II, Calcul différentiel. IIe partie (Paris : Gauthier-Villars et fils)
- 1893: (in French) J. Tannery and J. Molk Eléments de la théorie des fonctions elliptiques. Tome III, Calcul intégral. Ire partie, Théorèmes généraux. Inversion (Paris : Gauthier-Villars et fils)
- 1893: (in French) J. Tannery and J. Molk Eléments de la théorie des fonctions elliptiques. Tome IV, Calcul intégral. IIe partie, Applications (Paris : Gauthier-Villars et fils)
- 1901: Notice sur les travaux scientifique de M. Jules Tannery, Gauthier-Villars via Internet Archive
- 1904: Introduction à la théorie des fonctions d'une variable, volume 1, Librairie Scientifique A. Hermann
- 1910: Introduction á la théorie des fonctions d'une variable, volume 2, Librairie Scientifique A. Hermann
- 1906: Leçons d'algèbra et d'analyse, volume 1 via Internet Archive
- 1906: Leçons d'algèbra et d'analyse, volume 2 via Internet Archive
- 1910: Correspondence entre Lejeun Dirichlet et Liouville via Internet Archive
- 1924: Science et Philosophie with Introduction by Émile Borel, Librairie Felix Alcan via Internet Archive
