= Jules Drach =

French mathematician (1871–1949)

Jules Joseph Drach
- Born: 13 March 1871; Sainte-Marie-aux-Mines, France
- Died: 8 March 1949 (aged 77); Cavalaire-sur-Mer, France
- Scientific career
- Fields: Mathematics
- Thesis: Essai sur une théorie générale de l'intégration et sur la classification des transcendantes (1898)

Jules Joseph Drach (13 March 1871, in Sainte-Marie-aux-Mines near Colmar – 8 March 1949, in Cavalaire-sur-Mer, Provence-Alpes-Côte d’Azur) was a French mathematician.

== Biography ==
Drach came from an Alsatian family of peasants. Because of the Franco-Prussian War the parents fled with their children to Saint-Dié. He attended school there and in Nancy before he studied at the École Normale Supérieure (ENS). In 1892 he received his agrégation and in 1898 he received his PhD under Paul Tannery at ENS with thesis Essai sur la théorie générale de l'intégration et sur la classification des transcendantes. In his thesis, Drach developed a Galois theory for differential equations, building upon the work of Émile Picard, Sophus Lie and Ernest Vessiot. After that he was Maître de Conférences at the University (Faculté des Sciences) in Clermont-Ferrand. Drach was successively a professor at Lille, Poitiers, and Toulouse, before he became in 1913 Professor for Analytic Mechanics and Higher Analysis at the Sorbonne. During World War I he studied the mathematical theory of ballistics and published the results of his research around 1920.

In retirement he moved to Cavalaire in southern France, where he had a country estate to which he frequently withdrew because of his health. He remained mathematically active in retirement.

In addition to mathematical analysis and its applications to mechanics, Drach worked on number theory, partial differential equations, and differential geometry. In 1929 he was elected a member of the Académie des Sciences.

Drach and his friend Émile Borel published, in 1892, their notes on lectures given by Henri Poincaré and, in 1895, their notes on lectures given by Paul Tannery. Drach was also a co-editor of the collected works of Poincaré.

Drach was married to Mathilde Guitton. His son Pierre Drach was a noted biologist.

== Works ==
- with Émile Borel as co-editor: Poincaré, H. (1892). Leçons sur la théorie de l'élasticité. Cours de physique mathématique. Paris: G. Carré.
- with Émile Borel: Introduction à l'Étude de la Théorie des Nombres et de l'Algèbre Supérieure, d'apres des Conférences faites à l'École Normale Supérieure, par M. Jules Tannery. Paris: Nony. 1895.
- "Sur les équations différentielles du premier ordre et du premier degré". Comptes Rendus de l'Académie des Sciences. 158: 926–929. 1914.
- Drach, Jules (1920). "L'équation différentielle de la balistique extérieure et son intégration par quadratures". Annales Scientifiques de l'École Normale Supérieure. 37: 1–94. doi:10.24033/asens.719.
