= Interchange of limiting operations =

Commutativity of certain mathematical operations

In mathematics, the study of interchange of limiting operations is one of the major concerns of mathematical analysis, in that two given limiting operations, say L and M, cannot be assumed to give the same result when applied in either order. One of the historical sources for this theory is the study of trigonometric series.

== Formulation ==
In symbols, the assumption

LM = ML,

where the left-hand side means that M is applied first, then L, and vice versa on the right-hand side, is not a valid equation between mathematical operators, under all circumstances and for all operands. An algebraist would say that the operations do not commute. The approach taken in analysis is somewhat different. Conclusions that assume limiting operations do 'commute' are called formal. The analyst tries to delineate conditions under which such conclusions are valid; in other words mathematical rigour is established by the specification of some set of sufficient conditions for the formal analysis to hold. This approach justifies, for example, the notion of uniform convergence. It is relatively rare for such sufficient conditions to be also necessary, so that a sharper piece of analysis may extend the domain of validity of formal results.

Professionally speaking, therefore, analysts push the envelope of techniques, and expand the meaning of well-behaved for a given context. G. H. Hardy wrote that "The problem of deciding whether two given limit operations are commutative is one of the most important in mathematics". An opinion apparently not in favour of the piece-wise approach, but of leaving analysis at the level of heuristic, was that of Richard Courant.

== Examples ==
Examples abound, one of the simplest being that for a double sequence a_{m,n}: it is not necessarily the case that the operations of taking the limits as m → ∞ and as n → ∞ can be freely interchanged. For example take

a_{m,n} = 2^{m − n}

in which taking the limit first with respect to n gives 0, and with respect to m gives ∞.

Many of the fundamental results of infinitesimal calculus also fall into this category: the symmetry of partial derivatives, differentiation under the integral sign, and Fubini's theorem deal with the interchange of differentiation and integration operators.

One of the major reasons why the Lebesgue integral is used is that theorems exist, such as the dominated convergence theorem, that give sufficient conditions under which integration and limit operation can be interchanged. Necessary and sufficient conditions for this interchange were discovered by Federico Cafiero.

== List of related theorems ==
- Interchange of limits:
  - Moore-Osgood theorem
- Interchange of limit and infinite summation:
  - Tannery's theorem
- Interchange of limit and derivatives:
  - If a sequence of functions $(f_n)$ converges at at least one point and the derivatives converge uniformly, then $(f_n)$ converges uniformly as well, say to some function $f$ and the limiting function of the derivatives is $f'$. While this is often shown using the mean value theorem for real-valued functions, the same method can be applied for higher-dimensional functions by using the mean value inequality instead.
- Interchange of partial derivatives:
  - Schwarz's theorem
- Interchange of integrals:
  - Fubini's theorem
- Interchange of limit and integral:
  - Dominated convergence theorem
  - Vitali convergence theorem
  - Fichera convergence theorem
  - Cafiero convergence theorem
  - Fatou's lemma
  - Monotone convergence theorem for integrals (Beppo Levi's lemma)
- Interchange of derivative and integral:
  - Leibniz integral rule

== See also ==
- Iterated limit
- Uniform convergence
