= Reynolds transport theorem =

3D generalization of the Leibniz integral rule

In differential calculus, the Reynolds transport theorem (also known as the Leibniz–Reynolds transport theorem), or simply the Reynolds theorem, named after Osborne Reynolds (1842–1912), is a three-dimensional generalization of the Leibniz integral rule. It is used to recast time derivatives of integrated quantities and is useful in formulating the basic equations of continuum mechanics.

Consider integrating f = f(x,t) over the time-dependent region Ω(t) that has boundary ∂Ω(t), then taking the derivative with respect to time:
$$\frac{d}{dt}\int_{\Omega(t)} \mathbf{f}\,dV.$$
If we wish to move the derivative into the integral, there are two issues: the time dependence of f, and the introduction of and removal of space from Ω due to its dynamic boundary. Reynolds transport theorem provides the necessary framework.

== General form ==
The Reynolds transport theorem can be expressed as follows:
$$\frac{d}{dt}\int_{\Omega(t)} \mathbf{f}\,dV = \int_{\Omega(t)} \frac{\partial \mathbf{f}}{\partial t}\,dV + \int_{\partial \Omega(t)} \left(\mathbf{v}_b\cdot\mathbf{n}\right)\mathbf{f}\,dA$$
in which n(x,t) is the outward-pointing unit normal vector, x is a point in the region and is the variable of integration, dV and dA are volume and surface elements at x, and v_{b}(x,t) is the velocity of the area element (not the flow velocity). The function f may be tensor-, vector- or scalar-valued. Note that the integral on the left hand side is a function solely of time, and so the total derivative has been used.

== Form for a material element ==
In continuum mechanics, this theorem is often used for material elements. These are parcels of fluids or solids which no material enters or leaves. If Ω(t) is a material element then there is a velocity function v = v(x,t), and the boundary elements obey
$$\mathbf{v}_b\cdot\mathbf{n}=\mathbf{v}\cdot\mathbf{n}.$$
This condition may be substituted to obtain:
$$\frac{d}{dt}\left(\int_{\Omega(t)} \mathbf{f}\,dV\right) = \int_{\Omega(t)} \frac{\partial \mathbf{f}}{\partial t}\,dV + \int_{\partial \Omega(t)} (\mathbf{v}\cdot\mathbf{n})\mathbf{f}\,dA.$$

Proof for a material element

Let Ω_{0} be reference configuration of the region Ω(t). Let the motion and the deformation gradient be given by
$$\begin{align}
\mathbf{x} &= \boldsymbol{\varphi}(\mathbf{X}, t), \\
\boldsymbol{F}(\mathbf{X},t) &= \boldsymbol{\nabla}\boldsymbol{\varphi}.
\end{align}$$

Let J(X,t) = det F(X,t). Define
$$\hat{\mathbf{f}}(\mathbf{X}, t) = \mathbf{f}(\boldsymbol{\varphi}(\mathbf{X}, t), t).$$
Then the integrals in the current and the reference configurations are related by
$$\begin{align}
\int_{\Omega(t)} \mathbf{f}(\mathbf{x},t)\,dV
&= \int_{\Omega_0} \mathbf{f}(\boldsymbol{\varphi}(\mathbf{X},t),t) \, J(\mathbf{X},t) \,dV_0 \\
&= \int_{\Omega_0} \hat{\mathbf{f}}(\mathbf{X},t) \, J(\mathbf{X},t) \, dV_0.
\end{align}$$

That this derivation is for a material element is implicit in the time constancy of the reference configuration: it is constant in material coordinates. The time derivative of an integral over a volume is defined as
$$\frac{d}{dt} \int_{\Omega(t)} \mathbf{f}(\mathbf{x},t)\,dV = \lim_{\Delta t \to 0} \frac{1}{\Delta t} \left(\int_{\Omega(t + \Delta t)} \mathbf{f}(\mathbf{x},\,t{+}\Delta t)\,dV - \int_{\Omega(t)} \mathbf{f}(\mathbf{x},t)\,dV\right).$$

Converting into integrals over the reference configuration, we get
$$\frac{d}{dt} \int_{\Omega(t)} \mathbf{f}(\mathbf{x},t) \, dV =
\lim_{\Delta t \to 0} \frac{1}{\Delta t} \left(\int_{\Omega_0} \hat{\mathbf{f}}(\mathbf{X},\,t{+}\Delta t)\, J(\mathbf{X},\,t{+}\Delta t)\,dV_0 - \int_{\Omega_0} \hat{\mathbf{f}}(\mathbf{X},t) \, J(\mathbf{X},t)\, dV_0\right).$$

Since Ω_{0} is independent of time, we have
$$\begin{align}
\frac{d}{dt} \int_{\Omega(t)} \mathbf{f}(\mathbf{x},t)\,dV
&= \int_{\Omega_0} \left(\lim_{\Delta t \to 0} \frac{ \hat{\mathbf{f}}(\mathbf{X},\,t{+}\Delta t)\, J(\mathbf{X},\,t{+}\Delta t) - \hat{\mathbf{f}}(\mathbf{X},t)\, J(\mathbf{X},t)}{\Delta t} \right)\,dV_0 \\
&= \int_{\Omega_0} \frac{\partial}{\partial t}\left(\hat{\mathbf{f}}(\mathbf{X},t)\, J(\mathbf{X},t)\right)\,dV_0 \\
&= \int_{\Omega_0} \left( \frac{\partial}{\partial t}\big(\hat{\mathbf{f}}(\mathbf{X},t)\big)\, J(\mathbf{X},t)+ \hat{\mathbf{f}}(\mathbf{X},t)\,\frac{\partial}{\partial t} \big(J(\mathbf{X},t)\big)\right) \,dV_0.
\end{align}$$

The time derivative of J is given by:
$$\begin{align}
\frac{\partial}{\partial t} J(\mathbf{X},t) &= \frac{\partial}{\partial t}(\det\boldsymbol{F}) \\
&= (\det\boldsymbol{F}) \operatorname{tr}\left(\boldsymbol{F}^{-1} \frac{\partial\boldsymbol F}{\partial t}\right)\\
&= (\det\boldsymbol{F}) \operatorname{tr}\left(\frac{\partial \boldsymbol{X}}{\partial \boldsymbol{\varphi}} \frac{\partial}{\partial t} \left(\frac{\partial\boldsymbol{\varphi}}{\partial\boldsymbol{X}}\right)\right)\\
&= (\det\boldsymbol{F}) \operatorname{tr}\left(\frac{\partial \boldsymbol{X}}{\partial \boldsymbol{\varphi}} \frac{\partial}{\partial \boldsymbol{X}} \left(\frac{\partial\boldsymbol{\varphi}}{\partial t}\right)\right) \\
&= (\det\boldsymbol{F}) \operatorname{tr}\left( \frac{\partial}{\partial \boldsymbol{x}}\left(\frac{\partial\boldsymbol{\varphi}}{\partial t}\right)\right) \\
&= (\det\boldsymbol{F})(\boldsymbol{\nabla} \cdot \mathbf{v}) \\
&= J(\mathbf{X},t)\,\boldsymbol{\nabla} \cdot \mathbf{v}\big(\boldsymbol{\varphi}(\mathbf{X},t),t\big) \\
&= J(\mathbf{X},t)\,\boldsymbol{\nabla} \cdot \mathbf{v}(\mathbf{x},t).
\end{align}$$

Therefore,
$$\begin{align}
\frac{d}{dt} \int_{\Omega(t)} \mathbf{f}(\mathbf{x},t)\,dV
&= \int_{\Omega_0} \left( \frac{\partial}{\partial t}\left(\hat{\mathbf{f}}(\mathbf{X},t)\right)\,J(\mathbf{X},t)+ \hat{\mathbf{f}}(\mathbf{X},t)\,J(\mathbf{X},t)\,\boldsymbol{\nabla} \cdot \mathbf{v}(\mathbf{x},t)\right) \,dV_0 \\
&= \int_{\Omega_0} \left(\frac{\partial}{\partial t}\left(\hat{\mathbf{f}}(\mathbf{X},t)\right)+ \hat{\mathbf{f}}(\mathbf{X},t)\,\boldsymbol{\nabla} \cdot \mathbf{v}(\mathbf{x},t)\right)\,J(\mathbf{X},t) \,dV_0 \\
&= \int_{\Omega(t)} \left(\dot{\mathbf{f}}(\mathbf{x},t)+ \mathbf{f}(\mathbf{x},t)\,\boldsymbol{\nabla} \cdot \mathbf{v}(\mathbf{x},t)\right)\,dV.
\end{align}$$
where $\dot{\mathbf{f}}$ is the material time derivative of f. The material derivative is given by
$$\dot{\mathbf{f}}(\mathbf{x},t) = \frac{\partial \mathbf{f}(\mathbf{x},t)}{\partial t} + \big(\boldsymbol{\nabla} \mathbf{f}(\mathbf{x},t)\big) \cdot \mathbf{v}(\mathbf{x},t).$$

Therefore,
$$\frac{d}{dt} \int_{\Omega(t)} \mathbf{f}(\mathbf{x},t)\,dV =
\int_{\Omega(t)} \left( \frac{\partial \mathbf{f}(\mathbf{x},t)}{\partial t} + \big(\boldsymbol{\nabla} \mathbf{f}(\mathbf{x},t)\big) \cdot\mathbf{v}(\mathbf{x},t) + \mathbf{f}(\mathbf{x},t)\,\boldsymbol{\nabla} \cdot \mathbf{v}(\mathbf{x},t) \right) \,dV,$$
or,
$$\frac{d}{dt} \int_{\Omega(t)} \mathbf{f}\,dV
= \int_{\Omega(t)} \left( \frac{\partial \mathbf{f}}{\partial t} + \boldsymbol{\nabla} \mathbf{f}\cdot\mathbf{v} + \mathbf{f}\,\boldsymbol{\nabla} \cdot \mathbf{v}\right)\,dV.$$

Using the identity
$$\boldsymbol{\nabla} \cdot (\mathbf{v}\otimes\mathbf{w}) = \mathbf{v}(\boldsymbol{\nabla} \cdot \mathbf{w}) + \boldsymbol{\nabla}\mathbf{v}\cdot\mathbf{w},$$
we then have
$$\frac{d}{dt}\left( \int_{\Omega(t)} \mathbf{f}\,dV\right)
= \int_{\Omega(t)} \left(\frac{\partial \mathbf{f}}{\partial t} + \boldsymbol{\nabla} \cdot (\mathbf{f}\otimes\mathbf{v})\right)\,dV.$$

Using the divergence theorem and the identity (a ⊗ b) · n = (b · n)a, we have
$$\begin{align}
\frac{d}{dt}\left( \int_{\Omega(t)} \mathbf{f}\,dV\right)
&= \int_{\Omega(t)}\frac{\partial \mathbf{f}}{\partial t}\,dV + \int_{\partial \Omega(t)}(\mathbf{f}\otimes\mathbf{v})\cdot\mathbf{n}\,dA \\
&= \int_{\Omega(t)}\frac{\partial \mathbf{f}}{\partial t}\,dV + \int_{\partial \Omega(t)}(\mathbf{v}\cdot\mathbf{n})\mathbf{f}\,dA.
\end{align}$$
Q.E.D.

== A special case ==
If we take Ω to be constant with respect to time, then v_{b} = 0 and the identity reduces to
$$\frac{d}{dt}\int_{\Omega} f\,dV = \int_{\Omega} \frac{\partial f}{\partial t}\,dV.$$
as expected. (This simplification is not possible if the flow velocity is incorrectly used in place of the velocity of an area element.)

=== Interpretation and reduction to one dimension ===
The theorem is the higher-dimensional extension of differentiation under the integral sign and reduces to that expression in some cases. Suppose f is independent of y and z, and that Ω(t) is a unit square in the yz-plane and has x limits a(t) and b(t). Then Reynolds transport theorem reduces to
$$\frac{d}{dt}\int_{a(t)}^{b(t)} f(x,t)\,dx = \int_{a(t)}^{b(t)} \frac{\partial f}{\partial t}\,dx + \frac{\partial b(t)}{\partial t} f\big(b(t),t\big) - \frac{\partial a(t)}{\partial t} f\big(a(t),t\big) \,,$$
which, up to swapping x and t, is the standard expression for differentiation under the integral sign.

== See also ==
- Leibniz integral rule – Differentiation under the integral sign formula
