= Tannery's theorem =

Mathematical analysis theorem

In mathematical analysis, Tannery's theorem gives sufficient conditions for the interchanging of the limit and infinite summation operations. It is named after Jules Tannery.

== Statement ==
Let $S_n = \sum_{k=0}^n a_k(n)$ and suppose that $\lim_{n\to\infty} a_k(n) = b_k$. If $|a_k(n)| \le M_k$ and $\sum_{k=0}^\infty M_k < \infty$, then $\lim_{n\to\infty} S_n = \sum_{k=0}^{\infty} b_k$.

== Proofs ==
Tannery's theorem follows directly from Lebesgue's dominated convergence theorem applied to the sequence space $\ell^1$.

An elementary proof can also be given.

== Example ==
Tannery's theorem can be used to prove that the binomial limit and the infinite series characterizations of the exponential $e^x$ are equivalent. Note that

$$\lim_{n\to\infty} \left(1 + \frac{x}{n}\right)^n = \lim_{n\to\infty} \sum_{k=0}^n {n \choose k} \frac{x^k}{n^k}.$$

Define $a_k(n) = {n \choose k} \frac{x^k}{n^k}$. We have that $|a_k(n)| \leq \frac{|x|^k}{k!}$ and that $\sum_{k=0}^\infty \frac{|x|^k}{k!} = e^{|x|} < \infty$, so Tannery's theorem can be applied and

$$\lim_{n\to\infty} \sum_{k=0}^\infty {n \choose k} \frac{x^k}{n^k}
=\sum_{k=0}^\infty \lim_{n\to\infty} {n \choose k} \frac{x^k}{n^k}
=\sum_{k=0}^\infty \frac{x^k}{k!}
= e^x.$$
