= Paul Tannery =

French mathematician (1843–1904)

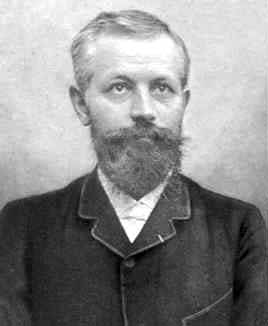
Paul Tannery

Paul Tannery (20 December 1843 – 27 November 1904) was a French mathematician and historian of mathematics. He was the older brother of mathematician Jules Tannery, to whose Notions Mathématiques he contributed an historical chapter. Though Tannery's career was in the tobacco industry, he devoted his evenings and his life to the study of mathematicians and mathematical development.

== Life and career ==
Tannery was born in Mantes-la-Jolie on 20 December 1843, to a deeply Catholic family. He attended private school in Mantes, followed by the Lycées in Le Mans and Caen. He then entered the École Polytechnique, on whose entrance exam he excelled. His curriculum included mathematics, the sciences, and the classics, all of which would be represented in his future academic work. Tannery's life of public service began as he then entered the École d'Applications des Tabacs as an apprentice engineer.

As an assistant engineer, Tannery spent two years in the state tobacco factory at Lille. In 1867, he moved to Paris; three years later, he served as an artillery captain in the Franco-Prussian War. Biographies of Tannery describe him as an ardent patriot and claim that he never fully accepted the humiliating Treaty of Frankfurt.

After his graduation from the École Polytechnique, Tannery had become interested in Auguste Comte and his positivist philosophy. After the war, his interest in mathematics continued, and Comte's ideas would influence his approach to the study of the history of science. Tannery moved several times with his career in the tobacco industry: to Périgord in 1872, to Bordeaux in 1874, to Le Havre in 1877, and to Paris in 1883. Bordeaux had something of an intellectual atmosphere, and though Tannery moved to Le Havre (near his parents, who lived at Caen) at his own request, he would also directly request the move to Paris, where his research and academic pursuits would be able to flourish.

Letter (1885)

It was in Paris that Tannery took on his first two major editorial works. In 1883, he began an edition of Diophantus's manuscripts, and in 1885, he and Charles Henry began an edition of one of Fermat's works. This work was made possible by access to the Bibliothèque Nationale, and so Tannery had to reduce his efforts in 1886 when he was transferred to Tonneins. Even without access to the Bibliothèque, Tannery remained hard at work, however, as he published two books composed of articles he had been writing for the Revue philosophique de la France et de l'étranger and for the Bulletin de sciences mathematiques.

In 1888, Tannery moved back to Bordeaux, where he studied Greek astronomy and directed the tobacco factory. Two years later, he was back in Paris; he would remain near Paris until his death. Despite a heavy professional workload, he continued to be productive in his work in the history of science. His editions of Diophantus and Fermat were published, along with over 250 articles. From 1890 forward, Tannery's other major work focused on a new edition of Descartes's works and correspondence, on which he collaborated with Charles Adam, an historian of modern philosophy.

Scandal arose in 1903 when the Collège de France began a search for a new professor of the history of science. Tannery was considered something of a shoo-in; he even began writing his inaugural lecture. Instead, the position went to Grégoire Wyrouboff, who concentrated on modern mathematicians instead of Tannery's classical and seventeenth-century idols. Wyrouboff was also a freethinker, an asset to the secularist Third Republic, while Tannery was Catholic.

Tannery died soon thereafter, on 27 November 1904, in Pantin, just outside Paris. His wife, Marie, would survive until 1945, and she published several of his works posthumously, helping to ensure that his legacy would live on.

He was an Invited Speaker of the ICM in 1904 in Heidelberg.

== Works ==
- La Géométrie grecque, comment son histoire nous est parvenue et ce que nous en savons. Paris: Gauthier-Villars. 1887.
- Pour l'histoire de la science hellène, Paris, Félix Alcan, 1887 (réimpr. Paris, Gauthier-Villars, 1930)
- Recherches sur l'histoire de l'astronomie ancienne, Paris, Gauthier-Villars, 1893
- Diophantus alexandrinus. Opera Omnia, 2 vol., Leipzig, B.G. Teubner, 1893-1895
- Œuvres de Fermat, (with Charles Henry), 5 Volumes, Paris, Gauthier-Villars, 1891-1922.
- Œuvres de Descartes, (with Charles Adam), Paris, Léopold Cerf, 1897-1909 (2 supplements in 1910 and 1913).
- Mémoires scientifiques (17 vol., Toulouse, Édouard Privat, Paris, Gauthier-Villars, 1912-1950) :

Sciences exactes dans l'Antiquité (Volumes I-III),
Sciences exactes chez les byzantins (Volume IV),
Sciences exactes au Moyen Âge (Volume V),
Sciences modernes (Volume VI),
Philosophie antique (Volume VII),
Philosophie moderne (Volume VIII),
Philologie (Volume IX),
Généralités historiques (Volume X),
Comptes rendus et analyses (Volumes XI-XII),
Correspondance (Volumes XIII-XVI),
Biographie, Bibliographie, compléments et tables, (Volume XVII).

== See also ==
- George Johnston Allman
- C. A. Bretschneider
- Moritz Cantor
- J. G. Friedlein
- James Gow
- Siegmund Günther
- Hermann Hankel
- J. L. Heiberg
- Friedrich Hultsch
- Gino Loria
- Maximilien Marie
- J. H. T. Müller
- G. H. F. Nesselmann
- Franz Susemihl
- Hieronymus Georg Zeuthen
