= Modes of convergence =

Property of a sequence or series

In mathematics, there are many senses in which a sequence or a series is said to be convergent.

== Elements of a topological space ==
Convergence can be defined in terms of sequences in first-countable spaces. Nets are a generalization of sequences that are useful in spaces which are not first countable. Filters further generalize the concept of convergence. In metric spaces, one can define Cauchy sequences. Cauchy nets and filters are generalizations to uniform spaces. Even more generally, Cauchy spaces are spaces in which Cauchy filters may be defined. Convergence implies "Cauchy convergence", and Cauchy convergence, together with the existence of a convergent subsequence implies convergence. The concept of completeness of metric spaces, and its generalizations is defined in terms of Cauchy sequences.

== Series of elements in a topological abelian group ==
In a topological abelian group, convergence of a series is defined as convergence of the sequence of partial sums. An important concept when considering series is unconditional convergence, which guarantees that the limit of the series is invariant under permutations of the summands.

In a normed vector space, one can define absolute convergence as convergence of the series ($\Sigma|b_k|$). Absolute convergence implies Cauchy convergence of the sequence of partial sums (by the triangle inequality), which in turn implies absolute convergence of some grouping (not reordering). The sequence of partial sums obtained by grouping is a subsequence of the partial sums of the original series. The convergence of each absolutely convergent series is an equivalent condition for a normed vector space to be Banach (i.e.: complete).

Absolute convergence and convergence together imply unconditional convergence, but unconditional convergence does not imply absolute convergence in general, even if the space is Banach, although the implication holds in $\mathbb{R}^d$.

== Convergence of sequence of functions on a topological space ==
The most basic type of convergence for a sequence of functions (in particular, it does not assume any topological structure on the domain of the functions) is pointwise convergence. It is defined as convergence of the sequence of values of the functions at every point. If the functions take their values in a uniform space, then one can define pointwise Cauchy convergence, uniform convergence, and uniform Cauchy convergence of the sequence.

Pointwise convergence implies pointwise Cauchy convergence, and the converse holds if the space in which the functions take their values is complete. Uniform convergence implies pointwise convergence and uniform Cauchy convergence. Uniform Cauchy convergence and pointwise convergence of a subsequence imply uniform convergence of the sequence, and if the codomain is complete, then uniform Cauchy convergence implies uniform convergence.

If the domain of the functions is a topological space and the codomain is a uniform space, local uniform convergence (i.e. uniform convergence on a neighborhood of each point) and compact (uniform) convergence (i.e. uniform convergence on all compact subsets) may be defined. "Compact convergence" is always short for "compact uniform convergence," since "compact pointwise convergence" would mean the same thing as "pointwise convergence" (points are always compact).

Uniform convergence implies both local uniform convergence and compact convergence, since both are local notions while uniform convergence is global. If X is locally compact (even in the weakest sense: every point has compact neighborhood), then local uniform convergence is equivalent to compact (uniform) convergence. Roughly speaking, this is because "local" and "compact" connote the same thing.

== Series of functions on a topological abelian group ==
Pointwise and uniform convergence of series of functions are defined in terms of convergence of the sequence of partial sums.

For functions taking values in a normed linear space, absolute convergence refers to convergence of the series of positive, real-valued functions $\Sigma|g_k|$ . "Pointwise absolute convergence" is then simply pointwise convergence of $\Sigma|g_k|$.

Normal convergence is convergence of the series of non-negative real numbers obtained by taking the uniform (i.e. "sup") norm of each function in the series (uniform convergence of $\Sigma|g_k|$). In Banach spaces, pointwise absolute convergence implies pointwise convergence, and normal convergence implies uniform convergence.

For functions defined on a topological space, one can define (as above) local uniform convergence and compact (uniform) convergence in terms of the partial sums of the series. If, in addition, the functions take values in a normed linear space, then local normal convergence (local, uniform, absolute convergence) and compact normal convergence (absolute convergence on compact sets) can be defined.

Normal convergence implies both local normal convergence and compact normal convergence. And if the domain is locally compact (even in the weakest sense), then local normal convergence implies compact normal convergence.

== Functions defined on a measure space ==
If one considers sequences of measurable functions, then several modes of convergence that depend on measure-theoretic, rather than solely topological properties, arise. This includes pointwise convergence almost-everywhere, convergence in p-mean and convergence in measure. These are of particular interest in probability theory.

== Index ==
Note that each of the following types of objects is a special case of types preceding it: sets, topological spaces, uniform spaces, topological abelian groups (TAG), normed vector spaces, Euclidean spaces, and the real/complex numbers. The following is a list of modes of convergence ...

For a sequence of elements {a_{n}} in a topological space (Y):

- Convergence, or "topological convergence" for emphasis (i.e. the existence of a limit).
- ...in a uniform space (U):
  - Cauchy-convergence

For a series of elements Σb_{k} in a TAG (G):

- Convergence (of partial sum sequence)
- Cauchy-convergence (of partial sum sequence)
- Unconditional convergence
- ...in a normed space (N):
  - Absolute convergence (convergence of $\sum |b_k|$)

For a sequence of functions {f_{n}} from a set (S) to a topological space (Y):

- Pointwise convergence
- ...from a set (S) to a uniform space (U):
  - Uniform convergence
  - Pointwise Cauchy-convergence
  - Uniform Cauchy-convergence
- ...from a topological space (X) to a uniform space (U):
  - Local uniform convergence (i.e. uniform convergence on a neighborhood of each point)
  - Compact (uniform) convergence (i.e. uniform convergence on all compact subsets)
- ...from a measure space (S,μ) to the complex numbers (C):
  - Almost everywhere convergence
  - Almost uniform convergence
  - L^{p} convergence
  - Convergence in measure
  - Convergence in distribution

For a series of functions Σg_{k} from a set (S) to a TAG (G):

- Pointwise convergence (of partial sum sequence)
- Uniform convergence (of partial sum sequence)
- Pointwise Cauchy-convergence (of partial sum sequence)
- Uniform Cauchy-convergence (of partial sum sequence)
- Unconditional pointwise convergence
- Unconditional uniform convergence
- ...from a set (S) to a normed space (N):
  - Pointwise absolute-convergence (pointwise convergence of $\Sigma|g_k|$)
  - Uniform absolute-convergence (uniform convergence of $\Sigma|g_k|$)
  - Normal convergence (convergence of the series of uniform norms $\Sigma||g_k||_u$)
- ...from a topological space (X) to a TAG (G):
  - Local uniform convergence (of partial sum sequence)
  - Compact (uniform) convergence (of partial sum sequence)
- ...from a topological space (X) to a normed space (N):
  - Local uniform absolute-convergence
  - Compact (uniform) absolute-convergence
  - Local normal convergence
  - Compact normal convergence

== See also ==
- Filters in topology – Use of filters to describe and characterize all basic topological notions and results
- Limit of a sequence – Value to which tends an infinite sequence
- Net (mathematics) – Generalization of a sequence of points
- Topologies on spaces of linear maps
- Limit of a sequence
- Convergence of measures
- Convergence in measure
- Convergence of random variables:
  - in distribution
  - in probability
  - almost sure
  - sure
  - in mean

== Bibliography ==
- Bahr, Patrick (2012). "Modes of Convergence for Term Graph Rewriting". Logical Methods in Computer Science 8 (2:06). pp. 1–60 – via Internet Archive
- Billingsley, Patrick (1999). Convergence of Probability Measures. New York: Wiley. ISBN 0471197459
