= List of things named after Karl Weierstrass =

This is a list of things named after the German mathematician Karl Weierstrass.

== Mathematical concepts, theorems, and the like ==
=== Named after Weierstrass and other persons ===
- Bolzano–Weierstrass theorem
- Casorati–Weierstrass theorem
- Weierstrass method
- Enneper–Weierstrass parameterization
- Lindemann–Weierstrass theorem
- Sochocki–Weierstrass theorem
- Stone–Weierstrass theorem
- Weierstrass–Enneper parameterization
- Weierstrass–Erdmann condition
- Weierstrass–Mandelbrot function

=== Named after Weierstrass alone ===
- Weierstrass approximation theorem
- Weierstrass coordinates
- Weierstrass's elliptic functions
- Weierstrass equation
- Weierstrass factorization theorem
- Weierstrass function (nowhere-differentiable function)
- Weierstrass sigma, zeta, and eta functions
- Weierstrass M-test
- Weierstrass Nullstellensatz
- Weierstrass point
- Weierstrass preparation theorem
- Weierstrass product inequality
- Weierstrass ring
- Weierstrass theorem (disambiguation) – any of several theorems
- Weierstrass transform

== Typography ==
- Weierstrass p, a form of the letter p used to denote the Weierstrass elliptic function

== Celestial bodies or features of them ==
- Weierstrass (crater)
- 14100 Weierstrass

== Research institutes ==
- Weierstrass Institute for Applied Analysis and Stochastics in Berlin, Germany
