= Pure mathematics =

Mathematics independent of applications

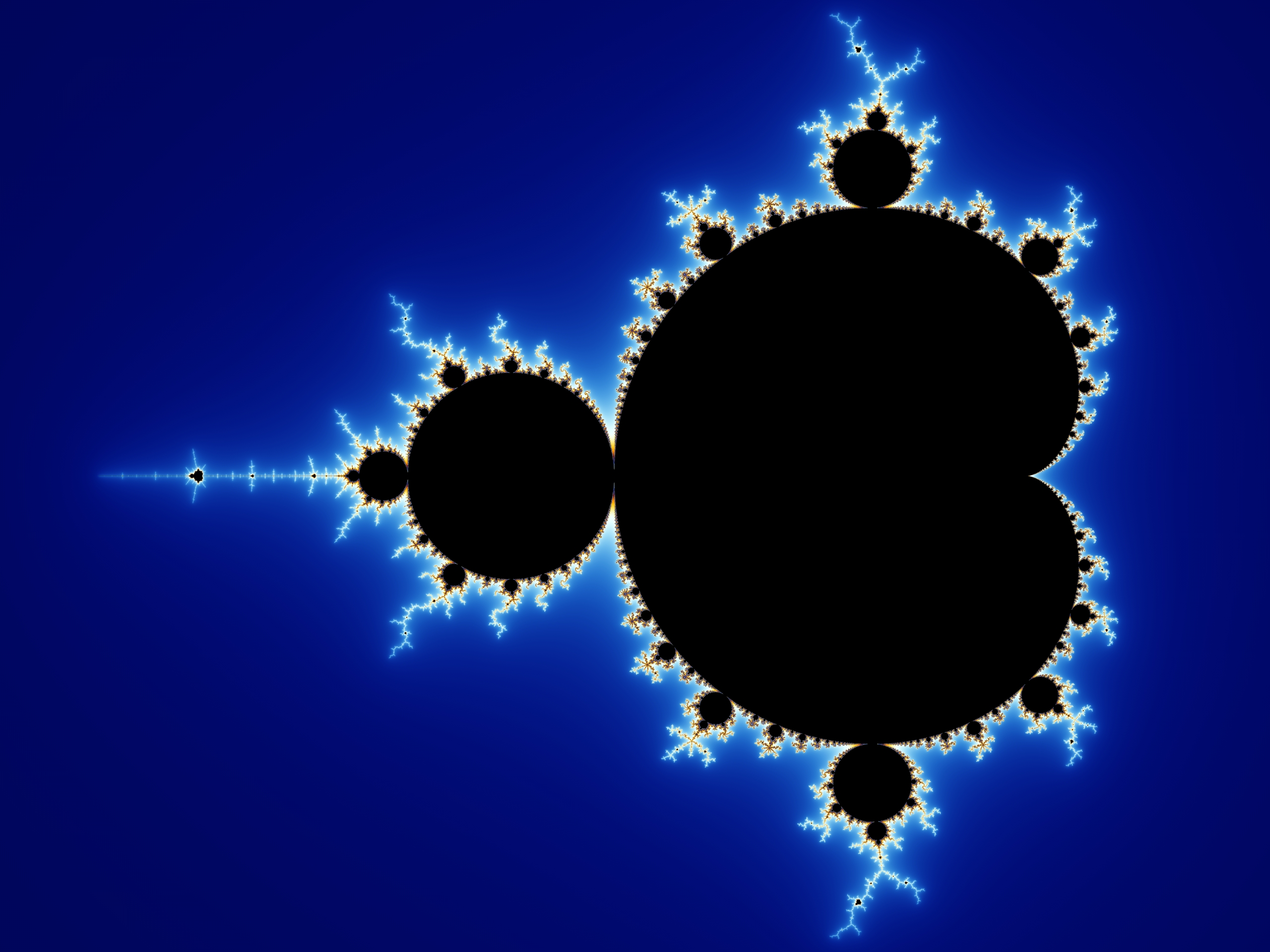
Pure mathematics is an informal term to describe the study of the properties and structure of abstract objects, such as the Mandelbrot set. This may be done without focusing on concrete applications of concepts in the physical world.

In the context of the philosophy of mathematics, pure mathematics is an informal term to describe the study of mathematical concepts independently of any application outside mathematics. These concepts may originate in real-world concerns, and the results obtained may later turn out to be useful for practical applications, but research is not primarily motivated by such applications. Instead, the appeal is attributed to the intellectual challenge and aesthetic beauty of defining new mathematical objects or working out the mathematical consequences of basic principles.

While the distinction between pure and applied mathematics has existed since at least ancient Greece, the concept was elaborated upon around the year 1900, after the introduction of theories with counter-intuitive properties (such as non-Euclidean geometries and Cantor's theory of infinite sets), and the discovery of apparent paradoxes (such as continuous functions that are nowhere differentiable, and Russell's paradox). This introduced the need to renew the concept of mathematical rigor and rewrite all mathematics accordingly, with a systematic use of axiomatic methods.

Nevertheless, almost all mathematical theories remained motivated by problems coming from the real world or from less abstract mathematical theories. Also, many mathematical theories, which had seemed to be totally pure mathematics, were eventually used in applied areas, mainly physics and computer science. A famous early example is Isaac Newton's demonstration that his law of universal gravitation implied that planets move in orbits that are conic sections, geometrical curves that had been studied in antiquity by Apollonius. Another example is the problem of factoring large integers, which is the basis of the RSA cryptosystem, widely used to secure Internet communications.

It follows that, currently, the distinction between pure and applied mathematics is more a philosophical point of view or preference rather than a rigid subdivision of mathematics.

== History ==
=== Ancient Greece ===
==== Mathematical Platonism ====
Ancient Greek mathematicians were amongst the earliest to make a distinction between pure and applied mathematics. Plato helped to create the gap between "arithmetic", now called number theory, and "logistic", now called arithmetic. Plato regarded logistic (arithmetic) as appropriate for businessmen and men of war who "must learn the art of numbers or [they] will not know how to array [their] troops" and arithmetic (number theory) as appropriate for philosophers "because [they have] to arise out of the sea of change and lay hold of true being." In this wise Euclid of Alexandria, when asked by one of his students of what use was the study of geometry, asked his slave to give the student threepence, "since he must make gain of what he learns." The Greek mathematician Apollonius of Perga, asked about the usefulness of some of his theorems in Book IV of Conics, asserted that

They are worthy of acceptance for the sake of the demonstrations themselves, in the same way as we accept many other things in mathematics for this and for no other reason.

And since many of his results were not applicable to the science or engineering of his day, Apollonius further argued in the preface of the fifth book of Conics that the subject is one of those that "...seem worthy of study for their own sake."

==== Aristotle ====
It is worth noting that in ancient Greek philosophy, an experimental approach of mathematics and no real distinction between mathematics and physics was already present in authors such as Thales and Archimedes, and for example in Aristotle and his school. This duality of platonism vs Aristotle is still present in modern mathematics.

Different historical records of the school of Pythagoras show this contradiction too from elements of mysticism similar to Plato to the proof irrationality which leads to the paradox that an infinite non repetitive set of digits cannot belong to the "finite" and "well defined" world of Euclidean geometry. Last but not least Zeno paradox shows again this duality between the pure logical reasoning (splitting distance by two is always possible) and the applied realm (the fact that the traveler never arrives).

=== 19th century ===
==== Pure mathematics invented ====
The term "pure mathematics" itself is enshrined in the full title of the Sadleirian Chair, "Sadleirian Professor of Pure Mathematics", founded (as a professorship) in the mid-nineteenth century. The idea of a separate discipline of pure mathematics may have emerged at that time. The generation of Carl Friedrich Gauss (1777 to 1855) made no sweeping distinction of the kind between pure and applied. In the following years, specialisation and professionalisation (particularly in the Weierstrass approach to mathematical analysis) started to make a rift more apparent.

==== The problem of infinities ====
After Weierstrass, by the end of 19th century, an important discussion about the role of infinities came from authors like Gregor Cantor and early examples of fractals and chaos. Ludwig Wittgenstein considered Cantor's approach with uncountable sets the cancer of mathematics. Henri Poincare seems to have compared set theory to a temporary disease Infinities in general are difficult to treat axiomatically, and therefore have been always considered on the fringe of pure mathematics, and this complexity became evident in the works of Bertrand Russell and Gödel on paradoxes in the early 20th century.

=== 20th century ===
At the start of the twentieth century, mathematicians took up the axiomatic method, strongly influenced by David Hilbert's example. The logical formulation of pure mathematics suggested by Bertrand Russell in terms of a quantifier structure of propositions seemed more and more plausible, as large parts of mathematics became axiomatised and thus subject to the simple criteria of rigorous proof.

Pure mathematics, according to a view that can be ascribed to the Bourbaki group, is what is proved. "Pure mathematician" became a recognized vocation, achievable through training. That said, the case was made pure mathematics is useful in engineering education:

There is a training in habits of thought, points of view, and intellectual comprehension of ordinary engineering problems, which only the study of higher mathematics can give.

Major advances in the beginning of 20th century was the formalization of abstract algebra and topology; these two fields were deeply influenced by the pure mathematics philosophy.

==== Finiteness, Number theory and Algebraic geometry ====
Historically areas often considered attached to pure mathematics are number theory, where these infinities are typically countable and algebraic geometry where functions are typically tamed functions (i.e. piecewise polynomial or rational functions). The success in the proof of Weil conjectures and the unification of these two fields ultimately in the geometric Langlands program gave momentum to the concept of pure mathematics as a research activity that can self sustain independently. On the other hand, the fields of functional analysis, partial differential equations, statistics and dynamical systems were often considered in the applied mathematics camp, and this is reflected in the typical organization of mathematics curriculum.

==== The advance of computers ====
By the end of the century numerical proofs of the four color theorem were primary examples of the advance of computers. Famous mathematicians such as Paul Cohen already in the 1970s challenged the concept of pure mathematics, stating that there will be a moment in the future that most mathematicians will be replaced by computers.

==== French vs Russian schools ====
The French school of mathematics and the western authors in general were deeply influenced by the Bourbaki group and therefore by the philosophical idea to detach mathematics from natural sciences. The Russian school of mathematics instead (e.g. Kolmogorov, Gelfand and Vladimir Arnold) believed that mathematics is actually fully grounded in experimental sciences such as physics and biology, this was reflected in the separation of the two schools during the Cold War era due to geopolitical motivations and by the works of authors like Robert Langlands which started to piece wise reconnect work from both schools.

=== 21st century ===
At the beginning of the 21st century, the application of artificial intelligence to pure mathematics has attracted the attention of such luminaries as Ken Ono and François Charton.

Looking at recent research fields such as the Analytic Langlands conjecture one can see that the distinction between pure and applied blurs again. Another example is the emergence of chaos in number theory and authors like Robert Langlands advocate for the unification of mathematics with Physics through the Langlands program.

== Pure versus applied mathematics ==
Mathematicians have always had differing opinions regarding the distinction between pure and applied mathematics. One of the most famous (but perhaps misunderstood) modern examples of this debate can be found in G.H. Hardy's 1940 essay A Mathematician's Apology.

It is widely believed that Hardy considered applied mathematics to be ugly and dull. Although it is true that Hardy preferred pure mathematics, which he often compared to painting and poetry, Hardy saw the distinction between pure and applied mathematics to be simply that applied mathematics sought to express physical truth in a mathematical framework, whereas pure mathematics expressed truths that were independent of the physical world. Hardy made a separate distinction in mathematics between what he called "real" mathematics, "which has permanent aesthetic value", and "the dull and elementary parts of mathematics" that have practical use.

Hardy considered some physicists, such as Einstein and Dirac, to be among the "real" mathematicians, but at the time that he was writing his Apology, he considered general relativity and quantum mechanics to be "useless", which allowed him to hold the opinion that only "dull" mathematics was useful. Moreover, Hardy briefly admitted that—just as the application of matrix theory and group theory to physics had come about unexpectedly—the time may come where some kinds of beautiful, "real" mathematics may be useful as well.

Another insightful view is offered by American mathematician Andy Magid:

I've always thought that a good model here could be drawn from ring theory. In that subject, one has the subareas of commutative ring theory and non-commutative ring theory. An uninformed observer might think that these represent a dichotomy, but in fact the latter subsumes the former: a non-commutative ring is a not-necessarily-commutative ring. If we use similar conventions, then we could refer to applied mathematics and nonapplied mathematics, where by the latter we mean not-necessarily-applied mathematics... [emphasis added]

Friedrich Engels argued in his 1878 book Anti-Dühring that "it is not at all true that in pure mathematics the mind deals only with its own creations and imaginations. The concepts of number and figure have not been invented from any source other than the world of reality". He further argued that "Before one came upon the idea of deducing the form of a cylinder from the rotation of a rectangle about one of its sides, a number of real rectangles and cylinders, however imperfect in form, must have been examined. Like all other sciences, mathematics arose out of the needs of men...But, as in every department of thought, at a certain stage of development the laws, which were abstracted from the real world, become divorced from the real world, and are set up against it as something independent, as laws coming from outside, to which the world has to conform."

== In education ==
After the year 2000, the case was made by authors like Cédric Villani that pure and abstract mathematics without a constructivist approach and taking into account other cognitive processes can become detrimental to education. More precisely that in order to reform the school system and the curriculum during 1960s and 1970s it was asked to the leading mathematicians how to teach mathematics and founding the educational system on set theory seemed to be the way to go. This led to a generation of un-prepared teachers, a generation of low-quality educational material and ultimately poor education.

We actually don't know how people learn mathematics, and an experimental approach to understand how to teach mathematics should be promoted.

— Cedric Villani

A few such examples are investment in mathematics education and by the Simons Foundation.

Any exact science contains typically two cognitive processes: an inductive one (i.e. from experimental evidence to abstraction) and a deductive one (i.e. from axioms to theorems and proofs). Both of them are key in the pedagogical process and more precisely the deductive one is typical of pure mathematics whereas the inductive one is key to mathematics education and to experimental mathematics.

The covid pandemic led also to the so called global learning crisis with adverse affects on all scientific education.

As of 2026, major commercially available LLM can reproduce multiple proofs of classical theorems, other LLMs can have very high scores in mathematical olympiads reflecting average high school mathematics. This technology, even without being able to produce novelty, has the potential to ideally transform education but it is currently not the case.

== In artificial intelligence ==
As of 2026 it may be feasible in some cases to automatically create large databases of mathematical knowledge (i.e. automating aspects of the experimental process) and automatically find patterns across large sets of data with artificial intelligence to derive mathematical conjectures (i.e. automating aspects of the inductive process). Then, putative proofs generated by artificial intelligence can be verified via proof assistant tools such as Lean, and large supporting databases of theorems (automating the deductive process). Some mathematicians believe that these approaches may become mainstream in the 21st century.

== See also ==
- Applied mathematics
- Logic
- Metalogic
- Metamathematics
