= Compact convergence =

Type of mathematical convergence in topology

In mathematics compact convergence (or uniform convergence on compact sets) is a type of convergence that generalizes the idea of uniform convergence. It is associated with the compact-open topology.

== Definition ==
Let $(X, \mathcal{T})$ be a topological space and $(Y,d_{Y})$ be a metric space. A sequence of functions

$f_{n} : X \to Y$, $n \in \mathbb{N},$

is said to converge compactly as $n \to \infty$ to some function $f : X \to Y$ if, for every compact set $K \subseteq X$,

$$f_{n}|_{K} \to f|_{K}$$

uniformly on $K$ as $n \to \infty$. This means that for all compact $K \subseteq X$,

$$\lim_{n \to \infty} \sup_{x \in K} d_{Y} \left( f_{n} (x), f(x) \right) = 0.$$

== Examples ==
- If $X = (0, 1) \subseteq \mathbb{R}$ and $Y = \mathbb{R}$ with their usual topologies, with $f_{n} (x) := x^{n}$, then $f_{n}$ converges compactly to the constant function with value 0, but uniform convergence does not hold.
- If $X=(0,1]$, $Y=\R$ and $f_n(x)=x^n$, then $f_n$ converges pointwise to the function that is zero on $(0,1)$ and one at $1$, but the sequence does not converge compactly.
- A very powerful tool for showing compact convergence is the Arzelà–Ascoli theorem. There are several versions of this theorem, roughly speaking it states that every sequence of equicontinuous and uniformly bounded maps has a subsequence that converges compactly to some continuous map.

== Properties ==
- If $f_{n} \to f$ uniformly, then $f_{n} \to f$ compactly.
- If $(X, \mathcal{T})$ is a compact space and $f_{n} \to f$ compactly, then $f_{n} \to f$ uniformly.
- If $(X, \mathcal{T})$ is a locally compact space, then $f_{n} \to f$ compactly if and only if $f_{n} \to f$ locally uniformly.
- If $(X, \mathcal{T})$ is a compactly generated space, $f_n\to f$ compactly, and each $f_n$ is continuous, then $f$ is continuous.

== See also ==
- Modes of convergence (annotated index)
- Montel's theorem
