= Transverse measure =

In mathematics, a measure on a real vector space is said to be transverse to a given set if it assigns measure zero to every translate of that set, while assigning finite and positive (i.e. non-zero) measure to some compact set.

== Definition ==
Let V be a real vector space together with a metric space structure with respect to which it is complete. A Borel measure μ is said to be transverse to a Borel-measurable subset S of V if

- there exists a compact subset K of V with 0 < μ(K) < +∞; and
- μ(v + S) = 0 for all v ∈ V, where

$$v + S = \{ v + s \in V | s \in S \}$$

is the translate of S by v.

The first requirement ensures that, for example, the trivial measure is not considered to be a transverse measure.

== Example ==
As an example, take V to be the Euclidean plane R^{2} with its usual Euclidean norm/metric structure. Define a measure μ on R^{2} by setting μ(E) to be the one-dimensional Lebesgue measure of the intersection of E with the first coordinate axis:

$$\mu (E)= \lambda^{1} \big( \{ x \in \mathbf{R} | (x, 0) \in E \subseteq \mathbf{R}^{2} \} \big).$$

An example of a compact set K with positive and finite μ-measure is K = B_{1}(0), the closed unit ball about the origin, which has μ(K) = 2. Now take the set S to be the second coordinate axis. Any translate (v_{1}, v_{2}) + S of S will meet the first coordinate axis in precisely one point, (v_{1}, 0). Since a single point has Lebesgue measure zero, μ((v_{1}, v_{2}) + S) = 0, and so μ is transverse to S.

== See also ==
- Prevalent and shy sets
