= Karl Weierstrass =

German mathematician (1815–1897)

- Karl Weierstraß
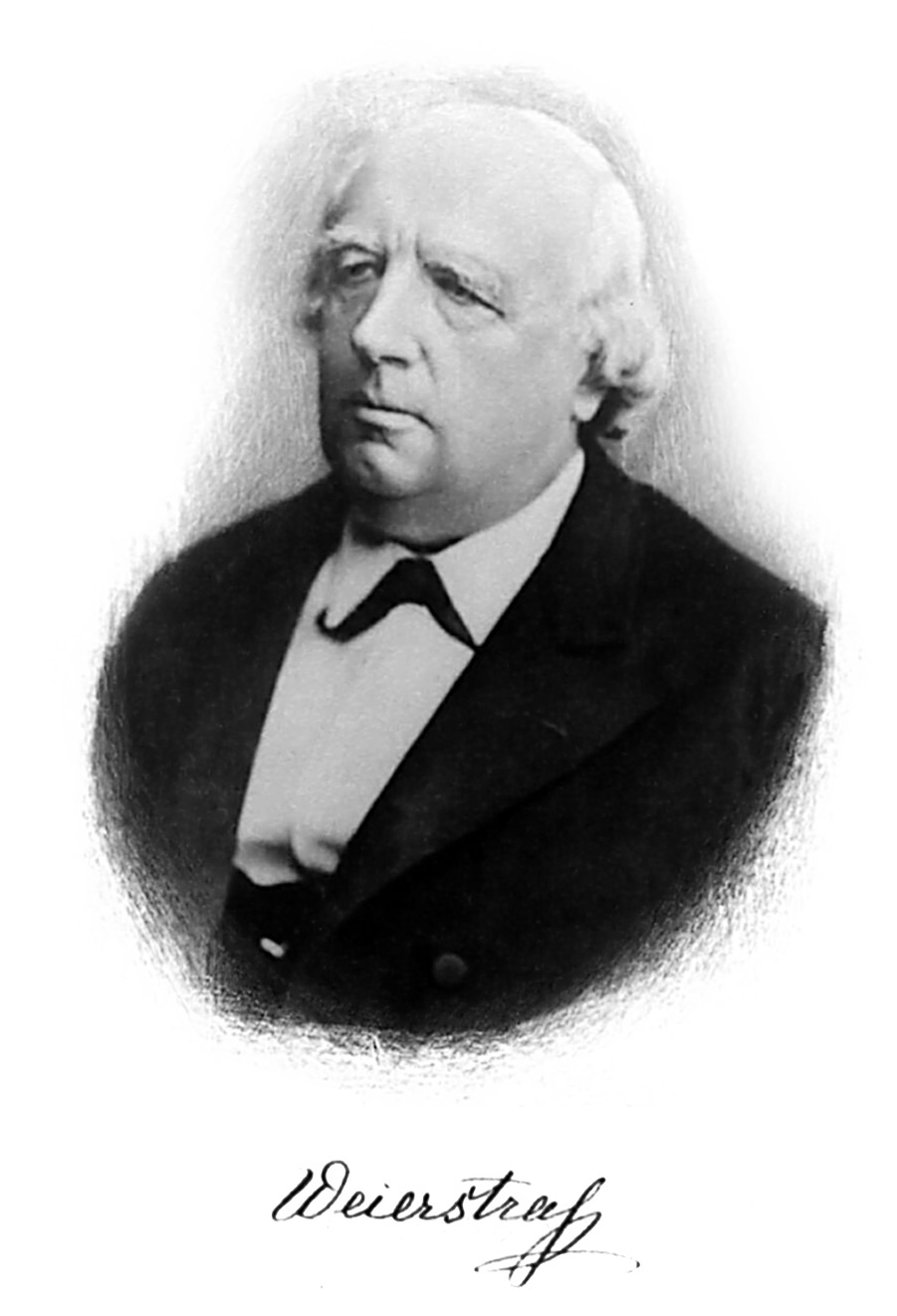
- Born: Karl Theodor Wilhelm Weierstraß; 31 October 1815; Ennigerloh, Province of Westphalia, Kingdom of Prussia
- Died: 19 February 1897 (aged 81); Berlin, Kingdom of Prussia, German Empire
- Education: University of Bonn; Münster Academy
- Known for: Weierstrass function; Weierstrass product inequality; (ε, δ)-definition of limit; Weierstrass–Erdmann condition; Weierstrass theorems; Bolzano–Weierstrass theorem
- Awards: PhD (Hon): University of Königsberg (1854); Copley Medal (1895)
- Scientific career
- Fields: Mathematics
- Workplaces: Gewerbeinstitut; Friedrich Wilhelm University
- Academic advisors: Christoph Gudermann
- Doctoral students: Georg Cantor; Georg Frobenius; Lazarus Fuchs; Wilhelm Killing; Johannes Knoblauch; Leo Königsberger; Ernst Kötter; Sofia Kovalevskaya; Hans von Mangoldt; Eugen Netto; Adolf Piltz; Carl Runge; Arthur Schoenflies; Friedrich Schottky; Hermann Schwarz; Ludwig Stickelberger
- Other notable students: Nikolai Bugaev; Edmund Husserl; Mathias Lerch

Karl Theodor Wilhelm Weierstrass (/ˈvaɪərˌstrɑːs, -ˌʃtrɑːs/; German: Weierstraß [ˈvaɪɐʃtʁaːs]; 31 October 1815 – 19 February 1897) was a German mathematician often cited as the "father of modern analysis". Despite leaving university without a degree, he studied mathematics and trained as a school teacher, eventually teaching mathematics, physics, botany and gymnastics. He later received an honorary doctorate and became professor of mathematics in Berlin.

Among many other contributions, Weierstrass formalized the definition of the continuity of a function and complex analysis, proved the intermediate value theorem and the Bolzano–Weierstrass theorem, and used the latter to study the properties of continuous functions on closed bounded intervals.

== Biography ==
Weierstrass was born into a Roman Catholic family in Ostenfelde, a village near Ennigerloh, in the Province of Westphalia.

Karl Weierstrass was the son of Wilhelm Weierstrass and Theodora Vonderforst, the former of whom was a government official and both of whom were Catholic Rhinelanders. His interest in mathematics began while he was a gymnasium student at the Theodorianum in Paderborn. He was sent to the University of Bonn upon graduation, to prepare for a government position; to this end, his studies were to be in the fields of law, economics, and finance—a situation immediately in conflict with his own hopes to study mathematics. He resolved the conflict by paying little heed to his planned course of study but continuing to study mathematics in private, which ultimately resulted in his leaving the university without a degree.

Weierstrass continued to study mathematics at the Münster Academy (an institution even then famous for mathematics), and his father was able to obtain a place for him in a teacher-training school in Münster; his efforts there did, eventually, lead to his certification as a teacher in that city. During this period of study, Weierstrass attended the lectures of Christoph Gudermann and became interested in elliptic functions.

In 1843 he taught in Deutsch Krone in West Prussia, and from 1848 he taught at the Lyceum Hosianum in Braunsberg. Besides mathematics, he also taught physics, botany, and gymnastics. At some point, Weierstrass may have had an illegitimate child with the widow of his friend Carl Wilhelm Borchardt.

After 1850, Weierstrass suffered from a long period of illness, but was yet able to publish mathematical articles of sufficient quality and originality to bring him fame and distinction. The University of Königsberg conferred an honorary doctorate on him on 31 March 1854. In 1856 he took a chair at the Gewerbeinstitut in Berlin (an institute to educate technical workers, which would later merge with the Bauakademie to form the Technische Hochschule in Charlottenburg; now Technische Universität Berlin). In 1864 he became professor at the Friedrich-Wilhelms-Universität Berlin, which later became the Humboldt Universität zu Berlin.

In 1870, at the age of fifty-five, Weierstrass met Sofia Kovalevskaya whom he tutored privately after failing to secure her admission to the university. They had a fruitful intellectual, and kindly personal relationship that "far transcended the usual teacher-student relationship". He mentored her for four years, and regarded her as his best student, helping to secure her a doctorate from Heidelberg University without the need for an oral thesis defense.

From 1870 until her death in 1891, Kovalevskaya corresponded with Weierstrass. Upon learning of her death, he burned her letters. About 150 of his letters to her have been preserved. Professor Reinhard Bölling discovered the draft of the letter she wrote to Weierstrass when she arrived in Stockholm in 1883 upon her appointment as Privatdocent at Stockholm University.

Weierstrass was immobile for the last three years of his life, and died in Berlin from pneumonia on the 19th of February, 1897.

== Mathematical contributions ==
=== Soundness of calculus ===
Weierstrass was interested in the soundness of calculus, and at the time there were somewhat ambiguous definitions of the foundations of calculus so that important theorems could not be proven with sufficient rigour. Although Bolzano had developed a reasonably rigorous definition of a limit as early as 1817 (and possibly even earlier) his work remained unknown to most of the mathematical community until years later, and many mathematicians had only vague definitions of limits and continuity of functions.

The basic idea behind Delta-epsilon proofs is, arguably, first found in the works of Cauchy in the 1820s. Cauchy did not clearly distinguish between continuity and uniform continuity on an interval. Notably, in his 1821 Cours d'analyse, Cauchy argued that the (pointwise) limit of (pointwise) continuous functions was itself (pointwise) continuous, a statement that is false in general. The correct statement is rather that the uniform limit of continuous functions is continuous (also, the uniform limit of uniformly continuous functions is uniformly continuous). This required the concept of uniform convergence, which was first observed by Weierstrass's advisor, Christoph Gudermann, in an 1838 paper, where Gudermann noted the phenomenon but did not define it or elaborate on it. Weierstrass saw the importance of the concept, and both formalized it and applied it widely throughout the foundations of calculus.

The formal definition of continuity of a function, as formulated by Weierstrass, is as follows:

$\displaystyle f(x)$ is continuous at $\displaystyle x = x_0$ if $\displaystyle \forall \ \varepsilon > 0\ \exists\ \delta > 0$ such that for every $x$ in the domain of $f$, $\displaystyle \ |x-x_0| < \delta \Rightarrow |f(x) - f(x_0)| < \varepsilon.$ In simple English, $\displaystyle f(x)$ is continuous at a point $\displaystyle x = x_0$ if for each $x$ close enough to $x_0$, the function value $f(x)$ is very close to $f(x_0)$, where the "close enough" restriction typically depends on the desired closeness of $f(x_0)$ to $f(x).$ Using this definition, he proved the Intermediate Value Theorem. He also proved the Bolzano–Weierstrass theorem and used it to study the properties of continuous functions on closed and bounded intervals.

=== Calculus of variations ===
Weierstrass also made advances in the field of calculus of variations. Using the apparatus of analysis that he helped to develop, Weierstrass was able to give a complete reformulation of the theory that paved the way for the modern study of the calculus of variations. Among several axioms, Weierstrass established a necessary condition for the existence of strong extrema of variational problems. He also helped devise the Weierstrass–Erdmann condition, which gives sufficient conditions for an extremal to have a corner along a given extremum and allows one to find a minimizing curve for a given integral.

=== Other analytical theorems ===
- Bolzano–Weierstrass theorem
- Stone–Weierstrass theorem
- Casorati–Weierstrass theorem
- Weierstrass elliptic function
- Weierstrass function
- Weierstrass M-test
- Weierstrass preparation theorem
- Lindemann–Weierstrass theorem
- Weierstrass factorization theorem
- Weierstrass–Enneper parameterization

== Honours and awards ==
The lunar crater Weierstrass and the asteroid 14100 Weierstrass are named after him. Also, there is the Weierstrass Institute for Applied Analysis and Stochastics in Berlin.

== Selected works ==
- Zur Theorie der Abelschen Funktionen (1854)
- Theorie der Abelschen Funktionen (1856)
- Abhandlungen-1, Math. Werke. Bd. 1. Berlin, 1894
- Abhandlungen-2, Math. Werke. Bd. 2. Berlin, 1895
- Abhandlungen-3, Math. Werke. Bd. 3. Berlin, 1903
- Vorl. ueber die Theorie der Abelschen Transcendenten, Math. Werke. Bd. 4. Berlin, 1902
- Vorl. ueber Variationsrechnung, Math. Werke. Bd. 7. Leipzig, 1927

== See also ==
- List of things named after Karl Weierstrass
