= Normal convergence =

Type of convergence

In mathematics normal convergence is a type of convergence for series of functions. Like absolute convergence, it has the useful property that it is preserved when the order of summation is changed.

== History ==
The concept of normal convergence was first introduced by René Baire in 1908 in his book Leçons sur les théories générales de l'analyse.

== Definition ==
Given a set S and functions $f_n : S \to \mathbb{C}$ (or to any normed vector space), the series

$$\sum_{n=0}^\infty f_n(x)$$

is called normally convergent if the series of uniform norms of the terms of the series converges, i.e.,

$$\sum_{n=0}^\infty \|f_n\| := \sum_{n=0}^\infty \sup_{x \in S} |f_n(x)| < \infty.$$

== Distinctions ==
Normal convergence implies uniform absolute convergence, i.e., uniform convergence of the series of nonnegative functions $\sum_{n=0}^\infty |f_n(x)|$; this fact is essentially the Weierstrass M-test. However, they should not be confused; to illustrate this, consider

$$f_n(x) = \begin{cases} 1/n, & x = n, \\ 0, & x \ne n. \end{cases}$$

Then the series $\sum_{n=0}^\infty |f_n(x)|$ is uniformly convergent (for any ε take n ≥ 1/ε), but the series of uniform norms is the harmonic series and thus diverges. An example using continuous functions can be made by replacing these functions with bump functions of height 1/n and width 1 centered at each natural number n.

As well, normal convergence of a series is different from norm-topology convergence, i.e. convergence of the partial sum sequence in the topology induced by the uniform norm. Normal convergence implies norm-topology convergence if and only if the space of functions under consideration is complete with respect to the uniform norm. (The converse does not hold even for complete function spaces: for example, consider the harmonic series as a sequence of constant functions).

== Generalizations ==
=== Local normal convergence ===
A series can be called "locally normally convergent on X" if each point x in X has a neighborhood U such that the series of functions ƒ_{n} restricted to the domain U

$$\sum_{n=0}^\infty f_n\mid_U$$

is normally convergent, i.e. such that

$$\sum_{n=0}^\infty \| f_n\|_U < \infty$$

where the norm $\|\cdot\|_U$ is the supremum over the domain U.

=== Compact normal convergence ===
A series is said to be "normally convergent on compact subsets of X" or "compactly normally convergent on X" if for every compact subset K of X, the series of functions ƒ_{n} restricted to K

$$\sum_{n=0}^\infty f_n\mid_K$$

is normally convergent on K.

Note: if X is locally compact (even in the weakest sense), local normal convergence and compact normal convergence are equivalent.

== Properties ==
- Every normal convergent series is uniformly convergent, locally uniformly convergent, and compactly uniformly convergent. This is very important, since it assures that any re-arrangement of the series, any derivatives or integrals of the series, and sums and products with other convergent series will converge to the "correct" value.
- If $\sum_{n=0}^\infty f_n(x)$ is normally convergent to $f$, then any re-arrangement of the sequence (ƒ_{1}, ƒ_{2}, ƒ_{3} ...) also converges normally to the same ƒ. That is, for every bijection $\tau: \mathbb{N} \to \mathbb{N}$, $\sum_{n=0}^\infty f_{\tau(n)}(x)$ is normally convergent to $f$.

== See also ==
- Modes of convergence (annotated index)
