= Weierstrass theorem =

Several theorems are named after Karl Weierstrass. These include:

- The Weierstrass approximation theorem, of which one well known generalization is the Stone–Weierstrass theorem
- The Bolzano–Weierstrass theorem, which ensures compactness of closed and bounded sets in R^{n}
- The Weierstrass extreme value theorem, which states that a continuous function on a closed and bounded set obtains its extreme values
- The Weierstrass–Casorati theorem describes the behavior of holomorphic functions near essential singularities
- The Weierstrass preparation theorem describes the behavior of analytic functions near a specified point
- The Lindemann–Weierstrass theorem concerning the transcendental numbers
- The Weierstrass factorization theorem asserts that entire functions can be represented by a product involving their zeroes
- The Sokhatsky–Weierstrass theorem which helps evaluate certain Cauchy-type integrals

== See also ==
- List of topics named after Karl Weierstrass
