= Weierstrass M-test =

Criterion about convergence of series

In mathematics, the Weierstrass M-test is a test for determining whether an infinite series of functions converges uniformly and absolutely. It applies to series whose terms are bounded functions with real or complex values, and is analogous to the comparison test for determining the convergence of series of real or complex numbers. It is named after the German mathematician Karl Weierstrass (1815–1897).

== Statement ==
Weierstrass M-test. Suppose that (f_{n}) is a sequence of real- or complex-valued functions defined on a set A, and that there is a sequence of non-negative numbers (M_{n}) satisfying the conditions

- $|f_n(x)|\leq M_n$ for all $n \geq 1$ and all $x \in A$, and
- $\sum_{n=1}^{\infty} M_n$ converges.

Then the series

$$\sum_{n=1}^{\infty} f_n (x)$$

converges absolutely and uniformly on A.

A series satisfying the hypothesis is called normally convergent. The result is often used in combination with the uniform limit theorem. Together they say that if, in addition to the above conditions, the set A is a topological space and the functions f_{n} are continuous on A, then the series converges to a continuous function.

== Proof ==
Consider the sequence of functions

$$S_{n}(x) = \sum_{k=1}^{n}f_{k}(x).$$

Since the series $\sum_{n=1}^{\infty}M_{n}$ converges and M_{n} ≥ 0 for every n, then by the Cauchy criterion,

$$\forall \varepsilon>0 : \exists N : \forall m>n>N : \sum_{k=n+1}^{m}M_{k}<\varepsilon.$$

For the chosen N,

$$\forall x \in A : \forall m> n> N$$
$$\left|S_{m}(x)-S_{n}(x)\right|=\left|\sum_{k=n+1}^{m}f_{k}(x)\right|\overset{(1)}{\leq} \sum_{k=n+1}^{m}|f_{k}(x)|\leq \sum_{k=n+1}^{m}M_{k}<\varepsilon .$$

(Inequality (1) follows from the triangle inequality.)

For each x, the sequence S_{n}(x) is thus a Cauchy sequence in R or C, and by completeness, it converges to some number S(x) that depends on x. For n > N we can write

$$\left|S(x) - S_{n}(x)\right|=\left|\lim_{m\to\infty} S_{m}(x) - S_{n}(x)\right|=\lim_{m\to\infty} \left|S_{m}(x) - S_{n}(x)\right|\leq\varepsilon .$$

Since N does not depend on x, this means that the sequence S_{n} of partial sums converges uniformly to the function S. Hence, by definition, the series $\sum_{k=1}^{\infty}f_{k}(x)$ converges uniformly.

Analogously, one can prove that $\sum_{k=1}^{\infty}|f_{k}(x)|$ converges uniformly.

== Generalization ==
A more general version of the Weierstrass M-test holds if the common codomain of the functions (f_{n}) is a Banach space, in which case the premise

$$|f_n(x)|\leq M_n$$

is to be replaced by

$$\|f_n(x)\|\leq M_n$$,

where $\|\cdot\|$ is the norm on the Banach space. For an example of the use of this test on a Banach space, see the article Fréchet derivative.

== See also ==
- Example of Weierstrass M-test
