= Pointwise convergence =

Notion of convergence in mathematics

In mathematics, pointwise convergence is one of various senses in which a sequence of functions can converge to a particular function. It is weaker than uniform convergence, to which it is often compared.

== Definition ==
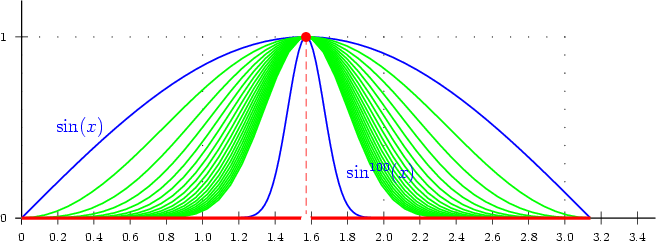
The pointwise limit of continuous functions does not have to be continuous: the continuous functions $\sin^n(x)$ (marked in green) converge pointwise to a discontinuous function (marked in red).

Suppose that $X$ is a set and $Y$ is a topological space, such as the real or complex numbers or a metric space, for example. A sequence of functions $\left(f_n\right)$ all having the same domain $X$ and codomain $Y$ is said to converge pointwise to a given function $f : X \to Y$ often written as
$$\lim_{n\to\infty} f_n = f\  \mbox{pointwise}$$
if (and only if) the limit of the sequence $f_n(x)$ evaluated at each point $x$ in the domain of $f$ is equal to $f(x)$, written as
$$\forall x \in X, \lim_{n\to\infty} f_n(x) = f(x).$$
The function $f$ is said to be the pointwise limit function of the $\left(f_n\right).$

The definition easily generalizes from sequences to nets $f_\bull = \left(f_a\right)_{a \in A}$. We say $f_\bull$ converges pointwise to $f$, written as
$$\lim_{a\in A} f_a = f\  \mbox{pointwise}$$
if (and only if) $f(x)$ is the unique accumulation point of the net $f_\bull(x)$ evaluated at each point $x$ in the domain of $f$, written as
$$\forall x \in X, \lim_{a\in A} f_a(x) = f(x).$$

Sometimes, authors use the term bounded pointwise convergence when there is a constant $C$ such that $\forall n,x,\;|f_n(x)|<C$ .

== Properties ==
This concept is often contrasted with uniform convergence. To say that
$$\lim_{n\to\infty} f_n = f\  \mbox{uniformly}$$
means that
$$\lim_{n\to\infty}\,\sup\{\,\left|f_n(x)-f(x)\right| : x \in A \,\}=0,$$
where $A$ is the common domain of $f$ and $f_n$, and $\sup$ stands for the supremum. That is a stronger statement than the assertion of pointwise convergence: every uniformly convergent sequence is pointwise convergent, to the same limiting function, but some pointwise convergent sequences are not uniformly convergent. For example, if $f_n : [0,1) \to [0,1)$ is a sequence of functions defined by $f_n(x) = x^n,$ then $\lim_{n\to\infty} f_n(x) = 0$ pointwise on the interval $[0, 1),$ but not uniformly.

The pointwise limit of a sequence of continuous functions may be a discontinuous function, but only if the convergence is not uniform. For example,
$$f(x) = \lim_{n\to\infty} \cos(\pi x)^{2n}$$
takes the value $1$ when $x$ is an integer and $0$ when $x$ is not an integer, and so is discontinuous at every integer.

The values of the functions $f_n$ need not be real numbers, but may be in any topological space, in order that the concept of pointwise convergence make sense. Uniform convergence, on the other hand, does not make sense for functions taking values in topological spaces generally, but makes sense for functions taking values in metric spaces, and, more generally, in uniform spaces.

== Topology ==
Let $Y^X$ denote the set of all functions from some given set $X$ into some topological space $Y.$ As described in the article on characterizations of the category of topological spaces, if certain conditions are met then it is possible to define a unique topology on a set in terms of which nets do and do not converge. The definition of pointwise convergence meets these conditions and so it induces a topology, called the topology of pointwise convergence, on the set $Y^X$ of all functions of the form $X \to Y.$ A net in $Y^X$ converges in this topology if and only if it converges pointwise.

The topology of pointwise convergence is the same as convergence in the product topology on the space $Y^X,$ where $X$ is the domain and $Y$ is the codomain. Explicitly, if $\mathcal{F} \subseteq Y^X$ is a set of functions from some set $X$ into some topological space $Y$ then the topology of pointwise convergence on $\mathcal{F}$ is equal to the subspace topology that it inherits from the product space $\prod_{x \in X} Y$ when $\mathcal{F}$ is identified as a subset of this Cartesian product via the canonical inclusion map $\mathcal{F} \to \prod_{x \in X} Y$ defined by $f \mapsto (f(x))_{x \in X}.$

If the codomain $Y$ is compact, then by Tychonoff's theorem, the space $Y^X$ is also compact.

== Almost everywhere convergence ==
In measure theory, one talks about almost everywhere convergence of a sequence of measurable functions defined on a measurable space. That means pointwise convergence almost everywhere, that is, on a subset of the domain whose complement has measure zero. Egorov's theorem states that pointwise convergence almost everywhere on a set of finite measure implies uniform convergence on a slightly smaller set.

Almost everywhere pointwise convergence on the space of functions on a measure space does not define the structure of a topology on the space of measurable functions on a measure space (although it is a convergence structure). For in a topological space, when every subsequence of a sequence has itself a subsequence with the same subsequential limit, the sequence itself must converge to that limit.

But consider the sequence of so-called "galloping rectangles" functions (also known as the typewriter sequence), which are defined using the floor function: let $N = \operatorname{floor}\left(\log_2 n\right)$ and $k = n$ mod $2^N,$ and let
$$f_n(x) = \begin{cases}
1, & \frac{k}{2^N} \leq x \leq \frac{k+1}{2^N} \\
0, & \text{otherwise}.
\end{cases}$$

Then any subsequence of the sequence $\left(f_n\right)_n$ has a sub-subsequence which itself converges almost everywhere to zero, for example, the subsequence of functions which do not vanish at $x = 0.$ But at no point does the original sequence converge pointwise to zero. Hence, unlike convergence in measure and $L^p$ convergence, pointwise convergence almost everywhere is not the convergence of any topology on the space of functions.

== See also ==
- Box topology – Concept in General Topology
- Convergence space – Generalization of the notion of convergence that is found in general topology
- Cylinder set – Natural basic set in product spaces
- List of topologies – List of concrete topologies and topological spaces
- Modes of convergence (annotated index) – Property of a sequence or series
- Strong operator topology – Locally convex topology on function spaces
- Topologies on spaces of linear maps
- Weak topology – Mathematical concept
- Weak-* topology – Mathematical concept
