= Weierstrass product inequality =

In mathematics, the Weierstrass product inequality states that for any real numbers 0 ≤ x_{1}, ..., x_{n} ≤ 1 we have

$$(1-x_1)(1-x_2)(1-x_3)(1-x_4)....(1-x_n) \geq 1-S_n,$$

and similarly, for 0 ≤ x_{1}, ..., x_{n},

$$(1+x_1)(1+x_2)(1+x_3)(1+x_4)....(1+x_n) \geq 1+S_n,$$

where $S_n=x_1+x_2+x_3+x_4+....+x_n.$

The inequality is named after the German mathematician Karl Weierstrass.

== Proof ==
The inequality with the subtractions can be proven easily via mathematical induction. The one with the additions is proven identically. We can choose $n = 1$ as the base case and see that for this value of $n$ we get

$$1 -x_1 \geq 1 - x_1$$

which is indeed true. Assuming now that the inequality holds for all natural numbers up to $n > 1$, for $n + 1$ we have:

$$\prod_{i=1}^{n+1}(1-x_i)\,\, = (1-x_{n+1})\prod_{i=1}^{n}(1-x_i)$$

$$\geq (1-x_{n+1})\left(1 - \sum_{i=1}^nx_i\right)$$

$$= 1 - \sum_{i=1}^nx_i - x_{n+1} + x_{n+1}\sum_{i=1}^nx_i$$

$$= 1 - \sum_{i=1}^{n+1}x_i  + x_{n+1}\sum_{i=1}^nx_i$$

$$\geq 1 - \sum_{i=1}^{n+1}x_i$$

which concludes the proof.
