= Convergence space =

Generalization of the notion of convergence that is found in general topology

In mathematics, a convergence space, also called a generalized convergence, is a set together with a relation called a convergence that satisfies certain properties relating elements of X with the family of filters on X. Convergence spaces generalize the notions of convergence that are found in point-set topology, including metric convergence and uniform convergence. Every topological space gives rise to a canonical convergence but there are convergences, known as non-topological convergences, that do not arise from any topological space. An example of convergence that is in general non-topological is almost everywhere convergence. Many topological properties have generalizations to convergence spaces.

Besides its ability to describe notions of convergence that topologies are unable to, the category of convergence spaces has an important categorical property that the category of topological spaces lacks. The category of topological spaces is not an exponential category (or equivalently, it is not Cartesian closed) although it is contained in the exponential category of pseudotopological spaces, which is itself a subcategory of the (also exponential) category of convergence spaces.

== Definition and notation ==
=== Preliminaries and notation ===
Denote the power set of a set $X$ by $\wp(X).$ The upward closure or isotonization in $X$ of a family of subsets $\mathcal{B} \subseteq \wp(X)$ is defined as

$$\mathcal{B}^{\uparrow X} := \left\{ S \subseteq X ~:~ B \subseteq S \text{ for some } B \in \mathcal{B} \, \right\} = \bigcup_{B \in \mathcal{B}} \left\{ S ~:~ B \subseteq S \subseteq X \right\}$$

and similarly the downward closure of $\mathcal{B}$ is $\mathcal{B}^{\downarrow} := \left\{ S \subseteq B ~:~ B \in \mathcal{B} \, \right\} = \bigcup_{B \in \mathcal{B}} \wp(B).$ If $\mathcal{B}^{\uparrow X} = \mathcal{B}$ (respectively $\mathcal{B}^{\downarrow} = \mathcal{B}$) then $\mathcal{B}$ is said to be upward closed (respectively downward closed) in $X.$

For any families $\mathcal{C}$ and $\mathcal{F},$ declare that

$\mathcal{C} \leq \mathcal{F}$ if and only if for every $C \in \mathcal{C},$ there exists some $F \in \mathcal{F}$ such that $F \subseteq C$

or equivalently, if $\mathcal{F} \subseteq \wp(X),$ then $\mathcal{C} \leq \mathcal{F}$ if and only if $\mathcal{C} \subseteq \mathcal{F}^{\uparrow X}.$ The relation $\,\leq\,$ defines a preorder on $\wp(\wp(X)).$ If $\mathcal{F} \geq \mathcal{C},$ which by definition means $\mathcal{C} \leq \mathcal{F},$ then $\mathcal{F}$ is said to be subordinate to $\mathcal{C}$ and also finer than $\mathcal{C},$ and $\mathcal{C}$ is said to be coarser than $\mathcal{F}.$ The relation $\,\geq\,$ is called subordination. Two families $\mathcal{C}$ and $\mathcal{F}$ are called equivalent (with respect to subordination $\,\geq\,$) if $\mathcal{C} \leq \mathcal{F}$ and $\mathcal{F} \leq \mathcal{C}.$

A filter on a set $X$ is a non-empty subset $\mathcal{F} \subseteq \wp(X)$ that is upward closed in $X,$ closed under finite intersections, and does not have the empty set as an element (i.e. $\varnothing \not\in \mathcal{F}$). A prefilter is any family of sets that is equivalent (with respect to subordination) to some filter or equivalently, it is any family of sets whose upward closure is a filter. A family $\mathcal{B}$ is a prefilter, also called a filter base, if and only if $\varnothing \not\in \mathcal{B} \neq \varnothing$ and for any $B, C \in \mathcal{B},$ there exists some $A \in \mathcal{B}$ such that $A \subseteq B \cap C.$ A filter subbase is any non-empty family of sets with the finite intersection property; equivalently, it is any non-empty family $\mathcal{B}$ that is contained as a subset of some filter (or prefilter), in which case the smallest (with respect to $\subseteq$ or $\leq$) filter containing $\mathcal{B}$ is called the filter (on $X$) generated by $\mathcal{B}$. The set of all filters (respectively prefilters, filter subbases, ultrafilters) on $X$ will be denoted by $\operatorname{Filters}(X)$ (respectively $\operatorname{Prefilters}(X),$ $\operatorname{FilterSubbases}(X),$ $\operatorname{UltraFilters}(X)$). The principal or discrete filter on $X$ at a point $x \in X$ is the filter $\{ x \}^{\uparrow X}.$

=== Definition of (pre)convergence spaces ===
For any $\xi \subseteq X \times \wp(\wp(X)),$ if $\mathcal{F} \subseteq \wp(X)$ then define

$$\lim\nolimits_\xi \mathcal{F} := \left\{ x \in X ~:~ \left( x, \mathcal{F} \right) \in \xi \right\}$$

and if $x \in X$ then define

$$\lim\nolimits^{-1}_{\xi} (x) := \left\{ \mathcal{F} \subseteq \wp(X) ~:~ \left( x, \mathcal{F} \right) \in \xi \right\}$$

so if $\left( x, \mathcal{F} \right) \in X \times \wp(\wp(X))$ then $x \in \lim\nolimits_{\xi} \mathcal{F}$ if and only if $\left( x, \mathcal{F} \right) \in \xi.$ The set $X$ is called the underlying set of $\xi$ and is denoted by $\left| \xi \right| := X.$

A preconvergence on a non-empty set $X$ is a binary relation $\xi \subseteq X \times \operatorname{Filters}(X)$ with the following property:

1. Isotone: if $\mathcal{F}, \mathcal{G} \in \operatorname{Filters}(X)$ then $\mathcal{F} \leq \mathcal{G}$ implies $\lim\nolimits_{\xi} \mathcal{F} \subseteq \lim\nolimits_{\xi} \mathcal{G}$
  - In words, any limit point of $\mathcal{F}$ is necessarily a limit point of any finer/subordinate family $\mathcal{G} \geq \mathcal{F}.$

and if in addition it also has the following property:

2. Centered: if $x \in X$ then $x \in \lim\nolimits_{\xi} \left( \{ x \}^{\uparrow X} \right)$
  - In words, for every $x \in X,$ the principal/discrete ultrafilter at $x$ converges to $x.$

then the preconvergence $\xi$ is called a convergence on $X.$ A generalized convergence or a convergence space (respectively a preconvergence space) is a pair consisting of a set $X$ together with a convergence (respectively preconvergence) on $X.$

A preconvergence $\xi \subseteq X \times \operatorname{Filters}(X)$ can be canonically extended to a relation on $X \times \operatorname{Prefilters}(X),$ also denoted by $\xi,$ by defining

$$\lim\nolimits_{\xi} \mathcal{F} := \lim\nolimits_{\xi} \left( \mathcal{F}^{\uparrow X} \right)$$

for all $\mathcal{F} \in \operatorname{Prefilters}(X).$ This extended preconvergence will be isotone on $\operatorname{Prefilters}(X),$ meaning that if $\mathcal{F}, \mathcal{G} \in \operatorname{Prefilters}(X)$ then $\mathcal{F} \leq \mathcal{G}$ implies $\lim\nolimits_{\xi} \mathcal{F} \subseteq \lim\nolimits_{\xi} \mathcal{G}.$

== Examples ==
=== Convergence induced by a topological space ===
Let $(X, \tau)$ be a topological space with $X \neq \varnothing.$ If $\mathcal{F} \in \operatorname{Filters}(X)$ then $\mathcal{F}$ is said to converge to a point $x \in X$ in $(X, \tau),$ written $\mathcal{F} \to x$ in $(X, \tau),$ if $\mathcal{F} \geq \mathcal{N}(x),$ where $\mathcal{N}(x)$ denotes the neighborhood filter of $x$ in $(X, \tau).$ The set of all $x \in X$ such that $\mathcal{F} \to x$ in $(X, \tau)$ is denoted by $\lim\nolimits_{(X, \tau)} \mathcal{F},$ $\lim\nolimits_X \mathcal{F},$ or simply $\lim \mathcal{F},$ and elements of this set are called limit points of $\mathcal{F}$ in $(X, \tau).$ The (canonical) convergence associated with or induced by $(X, \tau)$ is the convergence on $X,$ denoted by $\xi_{\tau},$ defined for all $x \in X$ and all $\mathcal{F} \in \operatorname{Filters}(X)$ by:

$x \in \lim\nolimits_{\xi_{\tau}} \mathcal{F}$ if and only if $\mathcal{F} \to x$ in $(X, \tau).$

Equivalently, it is defined by $\lim\nolimits_{\xi_{\tau}} \mathcal{F} := \lim\nolimits_{(X, \tau)} \mathcal{F}$ for all $\mathcal{F} \in \operatorname{Filters}(X).$

A (pre)convergence that is induced by some topology on $X$ is called a topological (pre)convergence; otherwise, it is called a non-topological (pre)convergence.

=== Power ===
Let $(X, \tau)$ and $(Z, \sigma)$ be topological spaces and let $C := C\left( (X, \tau); (Z, \sigma) \right)$ denote the set of continuous maps $f : (X, \tau) \to (Z, \sigma).$ The power with respect to $\tau$ and $\sigma$ is the coarsest topology $\theta$ on $C$ that makes the natural coupling $\left\langle x, f \right\rangle = f(x)$ into a continuous map $(X, \tau) \times \left( C, \theta \right) \to (Z, \sigma).$ The problem of finding the power has no solution unless $(X, \tau)$ is locally compact. However, if searching for a convergence instead of a topology, then there always exists a convergence that solves this problem (even without local compactness). In other words, the category of topological spaces is not an exponential category (i.e. or equivalently, it is not Cartesian closed) although it is contained in the exponential category of pseudotopologies, which is itself a subcategory of the (also exponential) category of convergences.

=== Other named examples ===
Standard convergence on $\mathbb{R}$
The standard convergence on the real line $X := \mathbb{R}$ is the convergence $\nu$ on $X$ defined for all $x \in X = \mathbb{R}$ and all $\mathcal{F} \in \operatorname{Filters}(X)$ by:
$x \in \lim\nolimits_{\nu} \mathcal{F}$ if and only if $\mathcal{F} ~\geq~ \left\{ \left( x - \frac1{n}, x + \frac1{n} \right) ~:~ n \in \mathbb{N} \right\}.$

Discrete convergence
The discrete preconvergence $\iota_{X}$ on a non-empty set $X$ is defined for all $x \in X$ and all $\mathcal{F} \in \operatorname{Filters}(X)$ by:
$x \in \lim\nolimits_{\iota_{X}} \mathcal{F}$ if and only if $\mathcal{F} ~=~ \{ x \}^{\uparrow X}.$
A preconvergence $\xi$ on $X$ is a convergence if and only if $\xi \leq \iota_{X}.$

Empty preconvergence
The empty preconvergence $\varnothing_{X}$ on set non-empty $X$ is defined for all $\mathcal{F} \in \operatorname{Filters}(X)$ by: $\lim\nolimits_{\varnothing_{X}} \mathcal{F} := \emptyset.$

Although it is a preconvergence on $X,$ it is not a convergence on $X.$ The empty preconvergence on $X \neq \varnothing$ is a non-topological preconvergence because for every topology $\tau$ on $X,$ the neighborhood filter at any given point $x \in X$ necessarily converges to $x$ in $(X, \tau).$

Chaotic convergence
The chaotic preconvergence $o_{X}$ on set non-empty $X$ is defined for all $\mathcal{F} \in \operatorname{Filters}(X)$ by: $\lim\nolimits_{o_{X}} \mathcal{F} := X.$ The chaotic preconvergence on $X$ is equal to the canonical convergence induced by $X$ when $X$ is endowed with the indiscrete topology.

== Properties ==
A preconvergence $\xi$ on set non-empty $X$ is called Hausdorff or T_{2} if, for all $\mathcal{F} \in \operatorname{Filters}(X)$, $\lim\nolimits_{\xi} \mathcal{F}$ is either a singleton set or empty. It is called T_{1} if $\lim\nolimits_{\xi} \left( \{ x \}^{\uparrow X} \right) \subseteq \{ x \}$ for all $x \in X$ and it is called T_{0} if $\lim\nolimits^{-1}_{\xi} (x) \neq \lim\nolimits^{-1}_{\xi} (y)$ for all distinct $x, y \in X.$ Every T_{1} preconvergence on a finite set is Hausdorff. Every T_{1} convergence on a finite set is discrete.

While the category of topological spaces is not exponential (i.e. Cartesian closed), it can be extended to an exponential category through the use of a subcategory of convergence spaces.

== See also ==
- Cauchy space – Concept in general topology and analysis
- Characterizations of the category of topological spaces – Multiple equivalent ways to define a topological space
- Convergent filter – Application of set theory concept
- Proximity space – Structure describing a notion of "nearness" between subsets
- Topological space – Mathematical space with a notion of closeness
