= Prevalent and shy sets =

Measure theory

In mathematics, the notions of prevalence and shyness are notions of "almost everywhere" and "measure zero" that are well-suited to the study of infinite-dimensional spaces and make use of the translation-invariant Lebesgue measure on finite-dimensional real spaces. The term "shy" was suggested by the American mathematician John Milnor.

== Definitions ==
=== Prevalence and shyness ===
Let $V$ be a real topological vector space and let $S$ be a Borel-measurable subset of $V.$ $S$ is said to be prevalent if there exists a finite-dimensional subspace $P$ of $V,$ called the probe set, such that for all $v \in V$ we have $v + p \in S$ for $\lambda_P$-almost all $p \in P,$ where $\lambda_P$ denotes the $\dim (P)$-dimensional Lebesgue measure on $P.$ Put another way, for every $v \in V,$ Lebesgue-almost every point of the hyperplane $v + P$ lies in $S.$

A non-Borel subset of $V$ is said to be prevalent if it contains a prevalent Borel subset.

A Borel subset of $V$ is said to be shy if its complement is prevalent; a non-Borel subset of $V$ is said to be shy if it is contained within a shy Borel subset.

An alternative, and slightly more general, definition is to define a set $S$ to be shy if there exists a transverse measure for $S$ (other than the trivial measure).

=== Local prevalence and shyness ===
A subset $S$ of $V$ is said to be locally shy if every point $v \in V$ has a neighbourhood $N_v$ whose intersection with $S$ is a shy set. $S$ is said to be locally prevalent if its complement is locally shy.

== Theorems involving prevalence and shyness ==
- If $S$ is shy, then so is every subset of $S$ and every translate of $S.$
- Every shy Borel set $S$ admits a transverse measure that is finite and has compact support. Furthermore, this measure can be chosen so that its support has arbitrarily small diameter.
- Any finite or countable union of shy sets is also shy. Analogously, countable intersection of prevalent sets is prevalent.
- Any shy set is also locally shy. If $V$ is a separable space, then every locally shy subset of $V$ is also shy.
- A subset $S$ of $n$-dimensional Euclidean space $\R^n$ is shy if and only if it has Lebesgue measure zero.
- Any prevalent subset $S$ of $V$ is dense in $V.$
- If $V$ is infinite-dimensional, then every compact subset of $V$ is shy.

In the following, "almost every" is taken to mean that the stated property holds of a prevalent subset of the space in question.

- Almost every continuous function from the interval $[0, 1]$ into the real line $\R$ is nowhere differentiable; here the space $V$ is $C([0, 1]; \R)$ with the topology induced by the supremum norm.
- Almost every function $f$ in the $L^p$ space $L^1([0, 1]; \R)$ has the property that $\int_0^1 f(x) \, \mathrm{d} x \neq 0.$ Clearly, the same property holds for the spaces of $k$-times differentiable functions $C^k([0, 1]; \R).$
- For $1 < p \leq +\infty,$ almost every sequence $a = \left(a_n\right)_{n \in \N} \in \ell^p$ has the property that the series $\sum_{n \in \N} a_n$ diverges.
- Prevalence version of the Whitney embedding theorem: Let $M$ be a compact manifold of class $C^1$ and dimension $d$ contained in $\R^n.$ For $1 \leq k \leq +\infty,$ almost every $C^k$ function $f : \R^n \to \R^{2d+1}$ is an embedding of $M.$
- If $A$ is a compact subset of $\R^n$ with Hausdorff dimension $d,$ $m \geq ,$ and $1 \leq k \leq +\infty,$ then, for almost every $C^k$ function $f : \R^n \to \R^m,$ $f(A)$ also has Hausdorff dimension $d.$
- For $1 \leq k \leq +\infty,$ almost every $C^k$ function $f : \R^n \to \R^n$ has the property that all of its periodic points are hyperbolic. In particular, the same is true for all the period $p$ points, for any integer $p.$
