= Uniformly Cauchy sequence =

In mathematics, a sequence of functions $\{f_{n}\}$ from a set S to a metric space M is said to be uniformly Cauchy if:

- For all $\varepsilon > 0$, there exists $N>0$ such that for all $x\in S$: $d(f_{n}(x), f_{m}(x)) < \varepsilon$ whenever $m, n > N$.

Another way of saying this is that $d_u (f_{n}, f_{m}) \to 0$ as $m, n \to \infty$, where the uniform distance $d_u$ between two functions is defined by

$$d_{u} (f, g) := \sup_{x \in S} d (f(x), g(x)).$$

== Convergence criteria ==
A sequence of functions {f_{n}} from S to M is pointwise Cauchy if, for each x ∈ S, the sequence {f_{n}(x)} is a Cauchy sequence in M. This is a weaker condition than being uniformly Cauchy.

In general a sequence can be pointwise Cauchy and not pointwise convergent, or it can be uniformly Cauchy and not uniformly convergent. Nevertheless, if the metric space M is complete, then any pointwise Cauchy sequence converges pointwise to a function from S to M. Similarly, any uniformly Cauchy sequence will tend uniformly to such a function.

The uniform Cauchy property is frequently used when the S is not just a set, but a topological space, and M is a complete metric space. The following theorem holds:

- Let S be a topological space and M a complete metric space. Then any uniformly Cauchy sequence of continuous functions f_{n} : S → M tends uniformly to a unique continuous function f : S → M.

== Generalization to uniform spaces ==
A sequence of functions $\{f_{n}\}$ from a set S to a uniform space U is said to be uniformly Cauchy if:

- For any entourage E of U, there exists $N>0$ such that, for all $x\in S$, $(f_{n}(x), f_{m}(x))\in E$ whenever $m, n > N$.

== See also ==
- Modes of convergence (annotated index)
