= Weierstrass function =

Weierstrass function may refer to:

- Weierstrass function (nowhere-differentiable function)
- Weierstrass sigma, zeta, and eta functions
- Weierstrass elliptic function
