= Uniform absolute-convergence =

Type of convergence

In mathematics, uniform absolute-convergence is a type of convergence for series of functions. Like absolute-convergence, it has the useful property that it is preserved when the order of summation is changed.

== Motivation ==
A convergent series of numbers can often be reordered in such a way that the new series diverges. This is not possible for series of nonnegative numbers, however, so the notion of absolute-convergence precludes this phenomenon. When dealing with uniformly convergent series of functions, the same phenomenon occurs: the series can potentially be reordered into a non-uniformly convergent series, or a series which does not even converge pointwise. This is impossible for series of nonnegative functions, so the notion of uniform absolute-convergence can be used to rule out these possibilities.

== Definition ==
Given a set X and functions $f_n : X \to \mathbb{C}$ (or to any normed vector space), the series

$$\sum_{n=0}^{\infty} f_n(x)$$

is called uniformly absolutely-convergent if the series of nonnegative functions

$$\sum_{n=0}^{\infty} |f_n(x)|$$

is uniformly convergent.

== Distinctions ==
A series can be uniformly convergent and absolutely convergent without being uniformly absolutely-convergent. For example, if ƒ_{n}(x) = x^{n}/n on the open interval (−1,0), then the series Σf_{n}(x) converges uniformly by comparison of the partial sums to those of Σ(−1)^{n}/n, and the series Σ|f_{n}(x)| converges absolutely at each point by the geometric series test, but Σ|f_{n}(x)| does not converge uniformly. Intuitively, this is because the absolute-convergence gets slower and slower as x approaches −1, where convergence holds but absolute convergence fails.

== Generalizations ==
If a series of functions is uniformly absolutely-convergent on some neighborhood of each point of a topological space, it is locally uniformly absolutely-convergent. If a series is uniformly absolutely-convergent on all compact subsets of a topological space, it is compactly (uniformly) absolutely-convergent. If the topological space is locally compact, these notions are equivalent.

== Properties ==
- If a series of functions into C (or any Banach space) is uniformly absolutely-convergent, then it is uniformly convergent.
- Uniform absolute-convergence is independent of the ordering of a series. This is because, for a series of nonnegative functions, uniform convergence is equivalent to the property that, for any ε > 0, there are finitely many terms of the series such that excluding these terms results in a series with total sum less than the constant function ε, and this property does not refer to the ordering.

== See also ==
- Modes of convergence (annotated index)
