= Convergence in measure =

Concepts in probability mathematics

Convergence in measure is either of two distinct mathematical concepts both of which generalize the concept of convergence in probability.

== Definitions ==
Let $f, f_n\ (n \in \mathbb N): X \to \mathbb R$ be measurable functions on a measure space $(X, \Sigma, \mu)$. The sequence $f_n$ is said to converge globally in measure to $f$ if for every $\varepsilon > 0,$
$$\lim_{n\to\infty} \mu(\{x \in X: |f(x)-f_n(x)|\geq \varepsilon\}) = 0,$$
and to converge locally in measure to $f$ if for every $\varepsilon>0$ and every $F \in \Sigma$ with $\mu (F) < \infty,$
$$\lim_{n\to\infty} \mu(\{x \in F: |f(x)-f_n(x)|\geq \varepsilon\}) = 0.$$

On a finite measure space, both notions are equivalent. Otherwise, convergence in measure can refer to either global convergence in measure or local convergence in measure, depending on the author.

== Properties ==
Throughout, $f$ and $f_n$ ($n\in\N$) are measurable functions $X\to\R$.

- Global convergence in measure implies local convergence in measure. The converse, however, is false; i.e., local convergence in measure is strictly weaker than global convergence in measure, in general.
- If, however, $\mu (X)<\infty$ or, more generally, if $f$ and all the $f_n$ vanish outside some set of finite measure, then the distinction between local and global convergence in measure disappears.
- If $\mu$ is σ-finite and (f_{n}) converges (locally or globally) to $f$ in measure, there is a subsequence converging to $f$ almost everywhere. The assumption of σ-finiteness is not necessary in the case of global convergence in measure.
- If $\mu$ is $\sigma$-finite, $(f_n)$ converges to $f$ locally in measure if and only if every subsequence has in turn a subsequence that converges to $f$ almost everywhere.
- In particular, if $(f_n)$ converges to $f$ almost everywhere, then $(f_n)$ converges to $f$ locally in measure. The converse is false.
- Fatou's lemma and the monotone convergence theorem hold if almost everywhere convergence is replaced by (local or global) convergence in measure.
- If $\mu$ is $\sigma$-finite, Lebesgue's dominated convergence theorem also holds if almost everywhere convergence is replaced by (local or global) convergence in measure.
- If $X=[a,b]\subseteq\R$ and μ is Lebesgue measure, there are sequences $(g_n)$ of step functions and $(h_n)$ of continuous functions converging globally in measure to $f$.
- If $f$ and $f_n$ are in L^{p}(μ) for some $p>0$ and $(f_n)$ converges to $f$ in the $p$-norm, then $(f_n)$ converges to $f$ globally in measure. The converse is false.
- If $f_n$ converges to $f$ in measure and $g_n$ converges to $g$ in measure then $f_n+g_n$ converges to $f+g$ in measure. Additionally, if the measure space is finite, $f_n g_n$ also converges to $fg$.

== Counterexamples ==
Let $X = \Reals$, $\mu$ be Lebesgue measure, and $f$ the constant function with value zero.

- The sequence $f_n = \chi_{[n,\infty)}$ converges to $f$ locally in measure, but does not converge to $f$ globally in measure.
- The sequence

$$f_n = \chi_{\left[\frac{j}{2^k},\frac{j+1}{2^k}\right]},$$

where $k = \lfloor \log_2 n\rfloor$ and $j=n-2^k$, the first five terms of which are

$$\chi_{\left[0,1\right]}, \;\chi_{\left[0,\frac12\right]},\;\chi_{\left[\frac12,1\right]},\;\chi_{\left[0,\frac14\right]},\;\chi_{\left[\frac14,\frac12\right]},$$

converges to $0$ globally in measure; but for no $x$ does $f_n(x)$ converge to zero. Hence $(f_n)$ fails to converge to $f$ almost everywhere.

- The sequence

$$f_n = n\chi_{\left[0,\frac1n\right]}$$

converges to $f$ almost everywhere and globally in measure, but not in the $p$-norm for any $p \geq 1$.

== Topology ==
There is a topology, called the topology of (local) convergence in measure, on the collection of measurable functions from X such that local convergence in measure corresponds to convergence on that topology. This topology is defined by the family of pseudometrics
$$\{\rho_F : F \in \Sigma,\ \mu (F) < \infty\},$$
where
$$\rho_F(f,g) = \int_F \min\{|f-g|,1\}\, d\mu.$$
In general, one may restrict oneself to some subfamily of sets F (instead of all possible subsets of finite measure). It suffices that for each $G\subset X$ of finite measure and $\varepsilon > 0$ there exists F in the family such that $\mu(G\setminus F)<\varepsilon.$ When $\mu(X) < \infty$, we may consider only one metric $\rho_X$, so the topology of convergence in finite measure is metrizable. If $\mu$ is an arbitrary measure finite or not, then
$$d(f,g) := \inf\limits_{\delta>0} \mu(\{|f-g|\geq\delta\}) + \delta$$
still defines a metric that generates the global convergence in measure.

Because this topology is generated by a family of pseudometrics, it is uniformizable. Working with uniform structures instead of topologies allows us to formulate uniform properties such as Cauchyness.

== See also ==
- Convergence space
