= Weierstrass–Erdmann condition =

Mathematical result from the calculus of variations

The Weierstrass–Erdmann condition is a mathematical result from the calculus of variations, which specifies sufficient conditions for broken extremals (that is, an extremal which is constrained to be smooth except at a finite number of "corners").

== Conditions ==
The Weierstrass-Erdmann corner conditions stipulate that a broken extremal $y(x)$ of a functional $J=\int\limits_a^b f(x,y,y')\,dx$ satisfies the following two continuity relations at each corner $c\in[a,b]$:

1. $\left.\frac{\partial f}{\partial y'}\right|_{x=c-0}=\left.\frac{\partial f}{\partial y'}\right|_{x=c+0}$
2. $\left.\left(f-y'\frac{\partial f}{\partial y'}\right)\right|_{x=c-0}=\left.\left(f-y'\frac{\partial f}{\partial y'}\right)\right|_{x=c+0}$.

== Applications ==
The condition allows one to prove that a corner exists along a given extremal. As a result, there are many applications to differential geometry. In calculations of the Weierstrass excess function, it is often helpful to find where corners exist along the curves. Similarly, the condition allows for one to find a minimizing curve for a given integral.
