= Equicontinuity =

Relation among continuous functions

In mathematical analysis, a family of functions is equicontinuous if all the functions are continuous and they have equal variation over a given neighbourhood, in a precise sense described herein. In particular, the concept applies to countable families, and thus sequences of functions.

Equicontinuity appears in the formulation of Ascoli's theorem, which states that a subset of C(X), the space of continuous functions on a compact Hausdorff space X, is compact if and only if it is closed, pointwise bounded and equicontinuous. As a corollary, a sequence in C(X) is uniformly convergent if and only if it is equicontinuous and converges pointwise to a function (not necessarily continuous a-priori). In particular, the limit of an equicontinuous pointwise convergent sequence of continuous functions f_{n} on either a metric space or a locally compact space is continuous. If, in addition, f_{n} are holomorphic, then the limit is also holomorphic.

The uniform boundedness principle states that a pointwise bounded family of continuous linear operators between Banach spaces is equicontinuous.

== Equicontinuity between metric spaces ==
Let X and Y be two metric spaces, and F a family of functions from X to Y. We shall denote by d the respective metrics of these spaces.

The family F is equicontinuous at a point x_{0} ∈ X if for every ε > 0, there exists a δ > 0 such that d(ƒ(x_{0}), ƒ(x)) < ε for all ƒ ∈ F and all x such that d(x_{0}, x) < δ. The family is pointwise equicontinuous if it is equicontinuous at each point of X.

The family F is uniformly equicontinuous if for every ε > 0, there exists a δ > 0 such that d(ƒ(x_{1}), ƒ(x_{2})) < ε for all ƒ ∈ F and all x_{1}, x_{2} ∈ X such that d(x_{1}, x_{2}) < δ.

For comparison, the statement 'all functions ƒ in F are continuous' means that for every ε > 0, every ƒ ∈ F, and every x_{0} ∈ X, there exists a δ > 0 such that d(ƒ(x_{0}), ƒ(x)) < ε for all x ∈ X such that d(x_{0}, x) < δ.

- For continuity, δ may depend on ε, ƒ, and x_{0}.
- For uniform continuity, δ may depend on ε and ƒ.
- For pointwise equicontinuity, δ may depend on ε and x_{0}.
- For uniform equicontinuity, δ may depend only on ε.

More generally, when X is a topological space, a set F of functions from X to Y is said to be equicontinuous at x if for every ε > 0, x has a neighborhood U_{x} such that

$$d_Y(f(y), f(x)) < \epsilon$$

for all y ∈ U_{x} and ƒ ∈ F. This definition usually appears in the context of topological vector spaces.

When X is compact, a set is uniformly equicontinuous if and only if it is equicontinuous at every point, for essentially the same reason as that uniform continuity and continuity coincide on compact spaces. Used on its own, the term "equicontinuity" may refer to either the pointwise or uniform notion, depending on the context. On a compact space, these notions coincide.

Some basic properties follow immediately from the definition. Every finite set of continuous functions is equicontinuous. The closure of an equicontinuous set is again equicontinuous. Every member of a uniformly equicontinuous set of functions is uniformly continuous, and every finite set of uniformly continuous functions is uniformly equicontinuous.

=== Examples ===
- A set of functions with a common Lipschitz constant is (uniformly) equicontinuous. In particular, this is the case if the set consists of functions with derivatives bounded by the same constant.
- Uniform boundedness principle gives a sufficient condition for a set of continuous linear operators to be equicontinuous.
- A family of iterates of an analytic function is equicontinuous on the Fatou set.

=== Counterexamples ===
- The set of all Lipschitz-continuous functions is not equicontinuous, as the maximal Lipschitz-constant is unbounded.
- The sequence of functions f_{n}(x) = arctan(nx), is not equicontinuous because the definition is violated at x_{0}=0.

== Equicontinuity of maps valued in uniform spaces ==
Suppose that X is a topological space and Y is a uniform space given by family of entourages $\mathcal{U}$. Topological vector spaces, metric spaces and topological groups are examples of uniform spaces; commutative topological groups have a canonical uniformity, while there is different possible choices for a uniformity on a non-commutative topological group.

Definition: A family S of maps from topological space X into uniform space $(Y, \mathcal{U})$ is said to be equicontinuous at x ∈ X if for every $W\in\mathcal{U}$, there exists some neighborhood U of x in X such that $f(U)\subseteq W[f(x)] = \{y : (y, f(x))\in W\}$ for every f ∈ S. We say that S is equicontinuous if it is equicontinuous at every point of X.

Clearly, every finite set of continuous maps from X into Y is equicontinuous.

== Equicontinuous linear maps ==
Because every topological vector space (TVS) is a topological group, the definition of an equicontinuous family of maps given for topological groups transfers to TVSs without change.

=== Characterization of equicontinuous linear maps ===
A family $H$ of maps of the form $X \to Y$ between two topological vector spaces is said to be equicontinuous at a point $x \in X$ if for every neighborhood $V$ of the origin in $Y$ there exists some neighborhood $U$ of the origin in $X$ such that $h(x + U) \subseteq h(x) + V$ for all $h \in H.$

If $H$ is a family of maps and $U$ is a set then let $H(U) := \bigcup_{h \in H} h(U).$ With notation, if $U$ and $V$ are sets then $h(U) \subseteq V$ for all $h \in H$ if and only if $H(U) \subseteq V.$

Let $X$ and $Y$ be topological vector spaces (TVSs) and $H$ be a family of linear operators from $X$ into $Y.$ Then the following are equivalent:

1. $H$ is equicontinuous;
2. $H$ is equicontinuous at every point of $X.$
3. $H$ is equicontinuous at some point of $X.$
4. $H$ is equicontinuous at the origin.
  - that is, for every neighborhood $V$ of the origin in $Y,$ there exists a neighborhood $U$ of the origin in $X$ such that $H(U) \subseteq V$ (or equivalently, $h(U) \subseteq V$for every $h \in H$).
5. for every neighborhood $V$ of the origin in $Y,$ $\bigcap_{h \in H} h^{-1}(V)$ is a neighborhood of the origin in $X.$
6. the closure of $H$ in $L_{\sigma}(X; Y)$ is equicontinuous.
  - $L_{\sigma}(X; Y)$ denotes $L(X; Y)$endowed with the topology of point-wise convergence.
7. the balanced hull of $H$ is equicontinuous.

while if $Y$ is locally convex then this list may be extended to include:

8. the convex hull of $H$ is equicontinuous.
9. the convex balanced hull of $H$ is equicontinuous.

while if $X$ and $Y$ are locally convex then this list may be extended to include:

10. for every continuous seminorm $q$ on $Y,$ there exists a continuous seminorm $p$ on $X$ such that $q \circ h \leq p$ for all $h \in H.$
  - Here, $q \circ h \leq p$ means that $q(h(x)) \leq p(x)$ for all $x \in X.$

while if $X$ is barreled and $Y$ is locally convex then this list may be extended to include:

11. $H$ is bounded in $L_{\sigma}(X; Y)$;
12. $H$ is bounded in $L_b(X; Y).$
  - $L_b(X; Y)$ denotes $L(X; Y)$endowed with the topology of bounded convergence (that is, uniform convergence on bounded subsets of $X.$

while if $X$ and $Y$ are Banach spaces then this list may be extended to include:

13. $\sup \{\|T\| : T \in H\} < \infty$ (that is, $H$ is uniformly bounded in the operator norm).

==== Characterization of equicontinuous linear functionals ====
Let $X$ be a topological vector space (TVS) over the field $\mathbb{F}$ with continuous dual space $X^{\prime}.$ A family $H$ of linear functionals on $X$ is said to be equicontinuous at a point $x \in X$ if for every neighborhood $V$ of the origin in $\mathbb{F}$ there exists some neighborhood $U$ of the origin in $X$ such that $h(x + U) \subseteq h(x) + V$ for all $h \in H.$

For any subset $H \subseteq X^{\prime},$ the following are equivalent:

1. $H$ is equicontinuous.
2. $H$ is equicontinuous at the origin.
3. $H$ is equicontinuous at some point of $X.$
4. $H$ is contained in the polar of some neighborhood of the origin in $X$
5. the (pre)polar of $H$ is a neighborhood of the origin in $X.$
6. the weak* closure of $H$ in $X^{\prime}$ is equicontinuous.
7. the balanced hull of $H$ is equicontinuous.
8. the convex hull of $H$ is equicontinuous.
9. the convex balanced hull of $H$ is equicontinuous.

while if $X$ is normed then this list may be extended to include:

10. $H$ is a strongly bounded subset of $X^{\prime}.$

while if $X$ is a barreled space then this list may be extended to include:

11. $H$ is relatively compact in the weak* topology on $X^{\prime}.$
12. $H$ is weak* bounded (that is, $H$ is $\sigma\left(X^{\prime}, X\right)-$bounded in $X^{\prime}$).
13. $H$ is bounded in the topology of bounded convergence (that is, $H$ is $b\left(X^{\prime}, X\right)-$bounded in $X^{\prime}$).

=== Properties of equicontinuous linear maps ===
The uniform boundedness principle (also known as the Banach–Steinhaus theorem) states that a set $H$ of linear maps between Banach spaces is equicontinuous if it is pointwise bounded; that is, $\sup_{h \in H} \|h(x)\| < \infty$ for each $x \in X.$ The result can be generalized to a case when $Y$ is locally convex and $X$ is a barreled space.

==== Properties of equicontinuous linear functionals ====
Alaoglu's theorem implies that the weak-* closure of an equicontinuous subset of $X^{\prime}$ is weak-* compact; thus that every equicontinuous subset is weak-* relatively compact.

If $X$ is any locally convex TVS, then the family of all barrels in $X$ and the family of all subsets of $X^{\prime}$ that are convex, balanced, closed, and bounded in $X^{\prime}_{\sigma},$ correspond to each other by polarity (with respect to $\left\langle X, X^{\#} \right\rangle$). It follows that a locally convex TVS $X$ is barreled if and only if every bounded subset of $X^{\prime}_{\sigma}$ is equicontinuous.

Theorem—Suppose that $X$ is a separable TVS. Then every closed equicontinuous subset of $X^{\prime}_{\sigma}$ is a compact metrizable space (under the subspace topology). If in addition $X$ is metrizable then $X^{\prime}_{\sigma}$ is separable.

== Equicontinuity and uniform convergence ==
Let X be a compact Hausdorff space, and equip C(X) with the uniform norm, thus making C(X) a Banach space, hence a metric space. Then Arzelà–Ascoli theorem states that a subset of C(X) is compact if and only if it is closed, uniformly bounded and equicontinuous. This is analogous to the Heine–Borel theorem, which states that subsets of R^{n} are compact if and only if they are closed and bounded. As a corollary, every uniformly bounded equicontinuous sequence in C(X) contains a subsequence that converges uniformly to a continuous function on X.

In view of Arzelà–Ascoli theorem, a sequence in C(X) converges uniformly if and only if it is equicontinuous and converges pointwise. The hypothesis of the statement can be weakened a bit: a sequence in C(X) converges uniformly if it is equicontinuous and converges pointwise on a dense subset to some function on X (not assumed continuous).

Proof

Suppose f_{j} is an equicontinuous sequence of continuous functions on a dense subset D of X. Let ε > 0 be given. By equicontinuity, for each z ∈ D, there exists a neighborhood U_{z} of z such that

$$|f_j(x) - f_j(z)| < \epsilon / 3$$

for all j and x ∈ U_{z}. By denseness and compactness, we can find a finite subset D′ ⊂ D such that X is the union of U_{z} over z ∈ D′. Since f_{j} converges pointwise on D′, there exists N > 0 such that

$$|f_j(z) - f_k(z)| < \epsilon / 3$$

whenever z ∈ D′ and j, k > N. It follows that

$$\sup_X |f_j - f_k| < \epsilon$$

for all j, k > N. In fact, if x ∈ X, then x ∈ U_{z} for some z ∈ D′ and so we get:

$$|f_j(x) - f_k(x)| \le |f_j(x) - f_j(z)| + |f_j(z) - f_k(z)| + |f_k(z) - f_k(x)| < \epsilon$$.

Hence, f_{j} is Cauchy in C(X) and thus converges by completeness.

This weaker version is typically used to prove Arzelà–Ascoli theorem for separable compact spaces. Another consequence is that the limit of an equicontinuous pointwise convergent sequence of continuous functions on a metric space, or on a locally compact space, is continuous. (See below for an example.) In the above, the hypothesis of compactness of X cannot be relaxed. To see that, consider a compactly supported continuous function g on R with g(0) = 1, and consider the equicontinuous sequence of functions {ƒ_{n}} on R defined by ƒ_{n}(x) = g(x − n). Then, ƒ_{n} converges pointwise to 0 but does not converge uniformly to 0.

This criterion for uniform convergence is often useful in real and complex analysis. Suppose we are given a sequence of continuous functions that converges pointwise on some open subset G of R^{n}. As noted above, it actually converges uniformly on a compact subset of G if it is equicontinuous on the compact set. In practice, showing the equicontinuity is often not so difficult. For example, if the sequence consists of differentiable functions or functions with some regularity (e.g., the functions are solutions of a differential equation), then the mean value theorem or some other kinds of estimates can be used to show the sequence is equicontinuous. It then follows that the limit of the sequence is continuous on every compact subset of G; thus, continuous on G. A similar argument can be made when the functions are holomorphic. One can use, for instance, Cauchy's estimate to show the equicontinuity (on a compact subset) and conclude that the limit is holomorphic. Note that the equicontinuity is essential here. For example, ƒ_{n}(x) = arctan n x converges to a multiple of the discontinuous sign function.

== Generalizations ==
=== Equicontinuity in topological spaces ===
The most general scenario in which equicontinuity can be defined is for topological spaces whereas uniform equicontinuity requires the filter of neighbourhoods of one point to be somehow comparable with the filter of neighbourhood of another point. The latter is most generally done via a uniform structure, giving a uniform space. Appropriate definitions in these cases are as follows:

A set A of functions continuous between two topological spaces X and Y is topologically equicontinuous at the points x ∈ X and y ∈ Y if for any open set O about y, there are neighborhoods U of x and V of y such that for every f ∈ A, if the intersection of f[U] and V is nonempty, f[U] ⊆ O. Then A is said to be topologically equicontinuous at x ∈ X if it is topologically equicontinuous at x and y for each y ∈ Y. Finally, A is equicontinuous if it is equicontinuous at x for all points x ∈ X.

A set A of continuous functions between two uniform spaces X and Y is uniformly equicontinuous if for every element W of the uniformity on Y, the set

{ (u,v) ∈ X × X: for all f ∈ A. (f(u),f(v)) ∈ W }

is a member of the uniformity on X

A weaker concept is that of even continuity

A set A of continuous functions between two topological spaces X and Y is said to be evenly continuous at x ∈ X and y ∈ Y if given any open set O containing y there are neighborhoods U of x and V of y such that f[U] ⊆ O whenever f(x) ∈ V. It is evenly continuous at x if it is evenly continuous at x and y for every y ∈ Y, and evenly continuous if it is evenly continuous at x for every x ∈ X.

=== Stochastic equicontinuity ===
Stochastic equicontinuity is a version of equicontinuity used in the context of sequences of functions of random variables, and their convergence.

== See also ==
- Absolute continuity – Form of continuity for functions
- Classification of discontinuities – Mathematical analysis of discontinuous points
- Coarse function
- Continuous function – Mathematical function with no sudden changes
- Continuous function (set theory) – Order-continuous function on ordinals
- Continuous stochastic process – Stochastic process that is a continuous function of time or index parameter
- Dini continuity – Special form of continuity
- Direction-preserving function - an analogue of a continuous function in discrete spaces.
- Microcontinuity – Mathematical term
- Normal function – Function of ordinals in mathematics
- Piecewise – Function defined by multiple sub-functions
- Symmetrically continuous function
- Uniform continuity – Uniform restraint of the change in functions
