= Space of continuous functions on a compact space =

In mathematical analysis, and especially functional analysis, a fundamental role is played by the space of continuous functions on a compact Hausdorff space $X$ with values in the real or complex numbers. This space, denoted by $\mathcal{C}(X),$ is a vector space with respect to the pointwise addition of functions and scalar multiplication by constants. It is, moreover, a normed space with norm defined by
$$\|f\| = \sup_{x\in X} |f(x)|,$$
the uniform norm. The uniform norm defines the topology of uniform convergence of functions on $X.$ The space $\mathcal{C}(X)$ is a Banach algebra with respect to this norm.(Rudin 1991, §10.3(a))

== Properties ==
- By Urysohn's lemma, $\mathcal{C}(X)$ separates points of $X$: If $x, y \in X$ are distinct points, then there is an $f \in \mathcal{C}(X)$ such that $f(x) \neq f(y).$
- The space $\mathcal{C}(X)$ is infinite-dimensional whenever $X$ is an infinite space (since it separates points). Hence, in particular, it is generally not locally compact.
- The Riesz–Markov–Kakutani representation theorem gives a characterization of the continuous dual space of $\mathcal{C}(X).$ Specifically, this dual space is the space of Radon measures on $X$ (regular Borel measures), denoted by $\operatorname{rca}(X).$ This space, with the norm given by the total variation of a measure, is also a Banach space belonging to the class of ba spaces. (Dunford & Schwartz 1958, §IV.6.3)
- Positive linear functionals on $\mathcal{C}(X)$ correspond to (positive) regular Borel measures on $X,$ by a different form of the Riesz representation theorem. (Rudin 1966, Chapter 2)
- If $X$ is infinite, then $\mathcal{C}(X)$ is not reflexive, nor is it weakly complete.
- The Arzelà–Ascoli theorem holds: A subset $K$ of $\mathcal{C}(X)$ is relatively compact if and only if it is bounded in the norm of $\mathcal{C}(X),$ and equicontinuous.
- The Stone–Weierstrass theorem holds for $\mathcal{C}(X).$ In the case of real functions, if $A$ is a subring of $\mathcal{C}(X)$ that contains all constants and separates points, then the closure of $A$ is $\mathcal{C}(X).$ In the case of complex functions, the statement holds with the additional hypothesis that $A$ is closed under complex conjugation.
- If $X$ and $Y$ are two compact Hausdorff spaces, and $F : \mathcal{C}(X) \to \mathcal{C}(Y)$ is a homomorphism of algebras which commutes with complex conjugation, then $F$ is continuous. Furthermore, $F$ has the form $F(h)(y) = h(f(y))$ for some continuous function $f : Y \to X.$ In particular, if $C(X)$ and $C(Y)$ are isomorphic as algebras, then $X$ and $Y$ are homeomorphic topological spaces.
- Let $\Delta$ be the space of maximal ideals in $\mathcal{C}(X).$ Then there is a one-to-one correspondence between Δ and the points of $X.$ Furthermore, $\Delta$ can be identified with the collection of all complex homomorphisms $\mathcal{C}(X) \to \Complex.$ Equip $\Delta$with the initial topology with respect to this pairing with $\mathcal{C}(X)$ (that is, the Gelfand transform). Then $X$ is homeomorphic to Δ equipped with this topology. (Rudin 1991, §11.13(a))
- A sequence in $\mathcal{C}(X)$ is weakly Cauchy if and only if it is (uniformly) bounded in $\mathcal{C}(X)$ and pointwise convergent. In particular, $\mathcal{C}(X)$ is only weakly complete for $X$ a finite set.
- The vague topology is the weak* topology on the dual of $\mathcal{C}(X).$
- The Banach–Alaoglu theorem implies that any normed space is isometrically isomorphic to a subspace of $C(X)$ for some $X.$

== Generalizations ==
The space $C(X)$ of real or complex-valued continuous functions can be defined on any topological space $X.$ In the non-compact case, however, $C(X)$ is not in general a Banach space with respect to the uniform norm since it may contain unbounded functions. Hence it is more typical to consider the space, denoted here $C_B(X)$ of bounded continuous functions on $X.$ This is a Banach space (in fact a commutative Banach algebra with identity) with respect to the uniform norm. (Hewitt & Stromberg 1965, Theorem 7.9)

It is sometimes desirable, particularly in measure theory, to further refine this general definition by considering the special case when $X$ is a locally compact Hausdorff space. In this case, it is possible to identify a pair of distinguished subsets of $C_B(X)$: (Hewitt & Stromberg 1965, §II.7)

- $C_{00}(X),$ the subset of $C(X)$ consisting of functions with compact support. This is called the space of functions vanishing in a neighborhood of infinity.
- $C_0(X),$ the subset of $C(X)$ consisting of functions such that for every $r > 0,$ there is a compact set $K \subseteq X$ such that $|f(x)| < r$ for all $x \in X \backslash K.$ This is called the space of functions vanishing at infinity.

The closure of $C_{00}(X)$ is precisely $C_0(X).$ In particular, the latter is a Banach space.
