= Giulio Ascoli =

Jewish-Italian mathematician (1843–1896)

- Born: 20 January 1843; Trieste, Austrian Empire
- Died: 12 July 1896 (aged 53); Milan, Italy
- Scientific career
- Fields: Mathematics

Giulio Ascoli (20 January 1843, Trieste, Austrian Empire – 12 July 1896, Milan) was a Jewish-Italian mathematician. He was a student of the Scuola Normale di Pisa, where he graduated in 1868.

In 1872 he became Professor of Algebra and Calculus of the Politecnico di Milano University. From 1879 he was professor of mathematics at the Reale Istituto Tecnico Superiore, where, in 1901, was affixed a plaque that remembers him.

He was also a corresponding member of Istituto Lombardo.

He made contributions to the theory of functions of a real variable and to Fourier series. For example, Ascoli introduced equicontinuity in 1884, a topic regarded as one of the fundamental concepts in the theory of real functions. In 1889, Italian mathematician Cesare Arzelà generalized Ascoli's Theorem into the Arzelà–Ascoli theorem, a practical sequential compactness criterion of functions.

== See also ==
- Measure (mathematics)
- Oscillation (mathematics)
- Riemann Integral

== Biographical references ==
- Guerraggio, Angelo; Nastasi, Pietro (2005), Italian mathematics between the two world wars, Science Networks. Historical Studies, vol. 29, Basel: Birkhäuser Verlag, pp. x+299, doi:10.1007/3-7643-7512-4, ISBN 3-7643-6555-2, MR 2188015, Zbl 1084.01010.
- Tricomi, G. F. (1962). "Giulio Ascoli". Matematici italiani del primo secolo dello stato unitario (Italian mathematicians of the first century of the unitary state). Memorie dell'Accademia delle Scienze di Torino. Classe di Scienze fisiche matematiche e naturali, series IV. Vol. I. p. 120. Zbl 0132.24405. Archived from the original on 28 July 2012.(in Italian). Available from the website of the.
