= Approximately continuous function =

Mathematical concept in measure theory

In mathematics, particularly in mathematical analysis and measure theory, an approximately continuous function is a concept that generalizes the notion of continuous functions by replacing the ordinary limit with an approximate limit. This generalization provides insights into measurable functions with applications in real analysis and geometric measure theory.

== Definition ==
Let $E \subseteq \mathbb{R}^n$ be a Lebesgue measurable set, $f\colon E \to \mathbb{R}^k$ be a measurable function, and $x_0 \in E$ be a point where the Lebesgue density of $E$ is 1. The function $f$ is said to be approximately continuous at $x_0$ if and only if the approximate limit of $f$ at $x_0$ exists and equals $f(x_0)$.

== Properties ==
A fundamental result in the theory of approximately continuous functions is derived from Lusin's theorem, which states that every measurable function is approximately continuous at almost every point of its domain. The concept of approximate continuity can be extended beyond measurable functions to arbitrary functions between metric spaces. The Stepanov-Denjoy theorem states:

Stepanov-Denjoy theorem: A function is measurable if and only if it is approximately continuous almost everywhere.

Approximately continuous functions are intimately connected to Lebesgue points. For a function $f \in L^1(E)$, a point $x_0$ is a Lebesgue point if it is a point of Lebesgue density 1 for $E$ and satisfies
$$\lim_{r\downarrow 0} \frac{1}{\lambda (B_r (x_0))} \int_{E\cap B_r (x_0)} |f(x)-f(x_0)|\, dx = 0$$
where $\lambda$ denotes the Lebesgue measure and $B_r(x_0)$ represents the ball of radius $r$ centered at $x_0$. Every Lebesgue point of a function is necessarily a point of approximate continuity. The converse relationship holds under additional constraints: when $f$ is essentially bounded, its points of approximate continuity coincide with its Lebesgue points.

== See also ==
- Approximate limit
- Density point
- Density topology (which serves to describe approximately continuous functions in a different way, as continuous functions for a different topology)
- Lebesgue point
- Lusin's theorem
- Measurable function
