= Precompact set =

Precompact set may refer to:

- Relatively compact subspace, a subset whose closure is compact
- Totally bounded set, a subset that can be covered by finitely many subsets of any fixed size
