= Cesare Arzelà =

Italian mathematician (1847–1912)

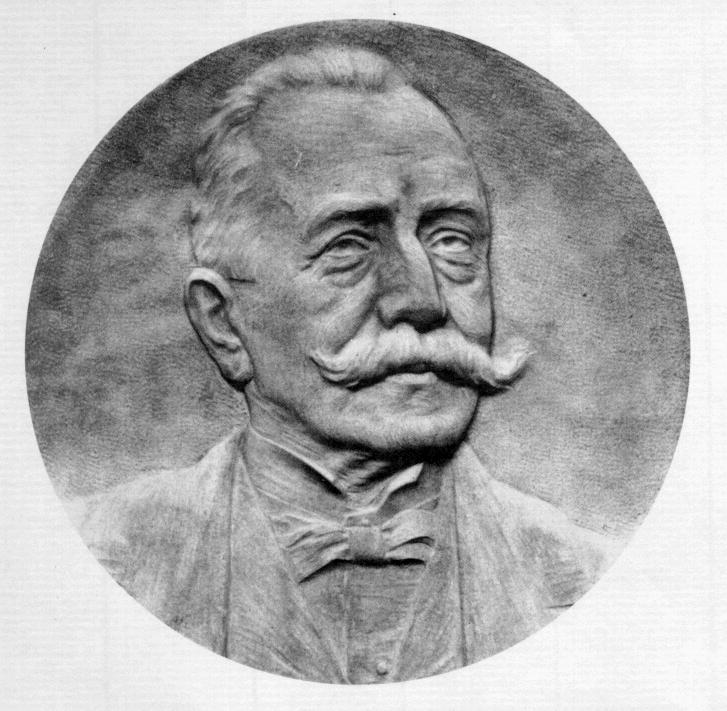
- A relief portraying Cesare Arzelà at the Mathematics Department of Bologna University
- Born: 6 March 1847; Santo Stefano di Magra, La Spezia, Italy
- Died: 12 March 1912 (aged 64); Santo Stefano di Magra, La Spezia, Italy
- Education: Scuola Normale Superiore
- Known for: Arzelà-Ascoli theorem, contributions to Functional analysis, mathematical analysis
- Scientific career
- Fields: Mathematics
- Workplaces: Scuola Normale Superiore, University of Florence, University of Bologna
- Doctoral advisor: Enrico Betti
- Doctoral students: Leonida Tonelli

Cesare Arzelà (6 March 1847–15 March 1912) was an Italian mathematician who taught at the University of Bologna and is recognized for his contributions in the theory of functions, particularly for his characterization of sequences of continuous functions, generalizing the one given earlier by Giulio Ascoli in the Arzelà–Ascoli theorem.

== Life ==
He was a pupil of the Scuola Normale Superiore of Pisa where he graduated in 1869. Arzelà came from a poor household; therefore he could not start his study until 1871, when he studied in Pisa under Enrico Betti and Ulisse Dini.

He was working in Florence (from 1875) and in 1878 obtained the Chair of Algebra at the University of Palermo.

After that, he became a professor in 1880 at the University of Bologna at the Department of analysis. He conducted research in the field of theory of functions. His most famous student was Leonida Tonelli.

In 1889 he generalized the Ascoli theorem to Arzelà–Ascoli theorem, an important theorem in the theory of functions.

He was a member of the Accademia Nazionale dei Lincei, and of several other academies.

== Works ==
- Arzelà, Cesare (7 May 1905), "Sulle funzioni di due variabili a variazione limitata (On functions of two variables of bounded variation)", Rendiconto delle Sessioni della Reale Accademia delle Scienze dell'Istituto di Bologna, Nuova serie, IX (4): 100–107, JFM 36.0491.02, archived from the original on 7 August 2007

== See also ==
- Total variation
