= Kolmogorov's theorem =

Kolmogorov's theorem is any of several different results by Andrey Kolmogorov:

In statistics

- Kolmogorov–Smirnov test

In real analysis

- Kolmogorov–Arnold representation theorem

In probability theory

- Hahn–Kolmogorov theorem
- Kolmogorov extension theorem
- Kolmogorov continuity theorem
- Kolmogorov's three-series theorem
- Kolmogorov's zero–one law
- Chapman–Kolmogorov equations
- Kolmogorov inequalities
  - Kolmogorov's inequality
  - Kolmogorov's inequality for positive submartingales

In functional analysis

- Landau–Kolmogorov inequality
- Fréchet–Kolmogorov theorem
