= Dominated convergence theorem =

Theorem in measure theory

In measure theory, Lebesgue's dominated convergence theorem gives a mild sufficient condition under which limits and integrals of a sequence of functions can be interchanged. More technically it says that if a sequence of functions is bounded in absolute value by an integrable function and is almost everywhere pointwise convergent to a function then the sequence converges in $L_1$ to its pointwise limit, and in particular the integral of the limit is the limit of the integrals. Its power and utility are two of the primary theoretical advantages of Lebesgue integration over Riemann integration.

In addition to its frequent appearance in mathematical analysis and partial differential equations, it is widely used in probability theory, since it gives a sufficient condition for the convergence of expected values of random variables.

== Statement ==
Lebesgue's dominated convergence theorem. Let $(f_n)$ be a sequence of complex-valued measurable functions on a measure space $(S,\Sigma,\mu)$. Suppose that the sequence converges pointwise to a function $f$ i.e.

$$\lim_{n \to \infty} f_n(x) = f(x)$$

exists for every $x \in S$. Assume moreover that the sequence $f_n$ is dominated by some integrable function $g$ in the sense that

$$|f_n(x)| \le g(x)$$

for all points $x\in S$ and all $n$ in the index set. Then $f_n, f$ are integrable (in the Lebesgue sense) and

$$\lim_{n\to\infty} \int_S f_n\,d\mu = \int_S \lim_{n\to \infty} f_n d\mu = \int_S f\,d\mu$$.

In fact, we have the stronger statement

$$\lim_{n\to\infty} \int_S |f_n-f| \, d\mu = 0.$$

Remark 1. The statement "$g$ is integrable" means that the measurable function $g$ is Lebesgue integrable; i.e since $g \ge 0$.

$$\int_S g\,d\mu < \infty.$$

Remark 2. The convergence of the sequence and domination by $g$ can be relaxed to hold only $\mu$-almost everywhere i.e. except possibly on a measurable set $Z$ of $\mu$-measure $0$. In fact we can modify the functions $f_n$ (hence its point wise limit $f$) to be 0 on $Z$ without changing the value of the integrals. (If we insist on e.g. defining $f$ as the limit whenever it exists, we may end up with a non-measurable subset within $Z$ where convergence is violated if the measure space is non complete, and so $f$ might not be measurable. However, there is no harm in ignoring the limit inside the null set $Z$). We can thus consider the $f_n$ and $f$ as being defined except for a set of $\mu$-measure 0.

Remark 3. If $\mu (S) < \infty$, the condition that there is a dominating integrable function $g$ can be relaxed to uniform integrability of the sequence (f_{n}), see Vitali convergence theorem.

Remark 4. While $f$ is Lebesgue integrable, it is not in general Riemann integrable. For example, order the rationals in $[0,1]$, and let $f_n$ be defined on $[0,1]$ to take the value 1 on the first n rationals and 0 otherwise. Then $f$ is the Dirichlet function on $[0,1]$, which is not Riemann integrable but is Lebesgue integrable.

Remark 5 The stronger version of the dominated convergence theorem can be reformulated as: if a sequence of measurable complex functions $f_n$ is almost everywhere pointwise convergent to a function $f$ and almost everywhere bounded in absolute value by an integrable function then $f_n \to f$ in the Banach space $L_1(S, \mu)$

== Proof ==
Without loss of generality, one can assume that f is real, because one can split f into its real and imaginary parts (remember that a sequence of complex numbers converges if and only if both its real and imaginary counterparts converge) and apply the triangle inequality at the end.

Lebesgue's dominated convergence theorem is a special case of the Fatou–Lebesgue theorem. Below, however, is a direct proof that uses Fatou’s lemma as the essential tool.

Since f is the pointwise limit of the sequence (f_{n}) of measurable functions that are dominated by g, it is also measurable and dominated by g, hence it is integrable. Furthermore, (these will be needed later),

$$|f-f_n| \le |f| + |f_n| \leq 2g$$

for all n and

$$\limsup_{n\to\infty} |f-f_n| = 0$$

where $\limsup_{n\to\infty}$ is the limit superior.

The second of these is trivially true (by the very definition of f). Using linearity and monotonicity of the Lebesgue integral,

$$\left | \int_S{f\,d\mu} - \int_S{f_n\,d\mu} \right|=   \left| \int_S{(f-f_n)\,d\mu} \right|\le \int_S{|f-f_n|\,d\mu}.$$

By the reverse Fatou lemma (it is here that we use the fact that |f−f_{n}| is bounded above by an integrable function)

$$\limsup_{n\to\infty} \int_S |f-f_n|\,d\mu \le \int_S \limsup_{n\to\infty} |f-f_n|\,d\mu = 0,$$

which implies that the limit exists and vanishes i.e.

$$\lim_{n\to\infty} \int_S |f-f_n|\,d\mu= 0.$$

Finally, since

$$\lim_{n\to\infty} \left|\int_S fd\mu-\int_S f_nd\mu\right| \leq\lim_{n\to\infty} \int_S |f-f_n|\,d\mu= 0.$$

we have that

$$\lim_{n\to\infty} \int_S f_n\,d\mu= \int_S f\,d\mu.$$

The theorem now follows.

If the assumptions hold only μ-almost everywhere, then there exists a μ-null set N ∈ Σ such that the functions f_{n} 1_{S \ N} satisfy the assumptions everywhere on S. Then the function f(x) defined as the pointwise limit of f_{n}(x) for x ∈ S \ N and by f(x) = 0 for x ∈ N, is measurable and is the pointwise limit of this modified function sequence. The values of these integrals are not influenced by these changes to the integrands on this μ-null set N, so the theorem continues to hold.

DCT holds even if f_{n} converges to f in measure (finite measure) and the dominating function is non-negative almost everywhere.

== Discussion of the assumptions ==
The assumption that the sequence is dominated by some integrable g cannot be dispensed with. This may be seen as follows: define f_{n}(x) = n for x in the interval (0, 1/n] and f_{n}(x) = 0 otherwise. Any g which dominates the sequence must also dominate the pointwise supremum h = sup_{n} f_{n}. Observe that

$$\int_0^1 h(x)\,dx \ge \int_{\frac{1}{m}}^1{h(x)\,dx} = \sum_{n=1}^{m-1} \int_{\left(\frac{1}{n+1},\frac{1}{n}\right]}{h(x)\,dx} \ge \sum_{n=1}^{m-1} \int_{\left(\frac{1}{n+1},\frac{1}{n}\right]}{n\,dx}=\sum_{n=1}^{m-1} \frac{1}{n+1} \to \infty \qquad \text{as }m\to\infty$$

by the divergence of the harmonic series. Hence, the monotonicity of the Lebesgue integral tells us that there exists no integrable function which dominates the sequence on [0,1]. A direct calculation shows that integration and pointwise limit do not commute for this sequence:

$$\int_0^1 \lim_{n\to\infty} f_n(x)\,dx = 0 \neq 1 = \lim_{n\to\infty}\int_0^1 f_n(x)\,dx,$$

because the pointwise limit of the sequence is the zero function. Note that the sequence (f_{n}) is not even uniformly integrable, hence also the Vitali convergence theorem is not applicable.

== Bounded convergence theorem ==
One corollary to the dominated convergence theorem is the bounded convergence theorem, which states that if (f_{n}) is a sequence of uniformly bounded complex-valued measurable functions which converges pointwise on a bounded measure space (S, Σ, μ) (i.e. one in which μ(S) is finite) to a function f, then the limit f is an integrable function and

$$\lim_{n\to\infty} \int_S{f_n\,d\mu} = \int_S{f\,d\mu}.$$

Remark: The pointwise convergence and uniform boundedness of the sequence can be relaxed to hold only μ-almost everywhere, provided the measure space (S, Σ, μ) is complete or f is chosen as a measurable function which agrees μ-almost everywhere with the μ-almost everywhere existing pointwise limit.

=== Proof ===
Since the sequence is uniformly bounded, there is a real number M such that |f_{n}(x)| ≤ M for all x ∈ S and for all n. Define g(x) = M for all x ∈ S. Then the sequence is dominated by g. Furthermore, g is integrable since it is a constant function on a set of finite measure. Therefore, the result follows from the dominated convergence theorem.

If the assumptions hold only μ-almost everywhere, then there exists a μ-null set N ∈ Σ such that the functions f_{n}1_{S\N} satisfy the assumptions everywhere on S.

== Dominated convergence in L^{p}-spaces (corollary) ==
Let $(\Omega,\mathcal{A},\mu)$ be a measure space, $1\leq p<\infty$ a real number and $(f_n)$ a sequence of $\mathcal{A}$-measurable functions $f_n:\Omega\to\Complex\cup\{\infty\}$.

Assume the sequence $(f_n)$ converges $\mu$-almost everywhere to an $\mathcal{A}$-measurable function $f$, and is dominated by a $g \in L^p$ (cf. Lp space), i.e., for every natural number $n$ we have: $|f_n|\leq g$, μ-almost everywhere.

Then all $f_n$ as well as $f$ are in $L^p$ and the sequence $(f_n)$ converges to $f$ in the sense of $L^p$, i.e.:

$$\lim_{n \to \infty}\|f_n-f\|_p =\lim_{n \to \infty}\left(\int_\Omega |f_n-f|^p \,d\mu\right)^{\frac{1}{p}} = 0.$$

Idea of the proof: Apply the original theorem to the function sequence $h_n = |f_n-f|^p$ with the dominating function $(2g)^p$.

== Extensions ==
The dominated convergence theorem applies also to measurable functions with values in a Banach space, with the dominating function still being non-negative and integrable as above. The assumption of convergence almost everywhere can be weakened to require only convergence in measure.

The dominated convergence theorem applies also to conditional expectations.

== See also ==
- Convergence of random variables, Convergence in mean
- Monotone convergence theorem (does not require domination by an integrable function but assumes monotonicity of the sequence instead)
- Scheffé's lemma
- Uniform integrability
- Vitali convergence theorem (a generalization of Lebesgue's dominated convergence theorem)
