= Vitali convergence theorem =

Mathematical theorem

In real analysis and measure theory, the Vitali convergence theorem, named after the Italian mathematician Giuseppe Vitali, is a generalization of the better-known dominated convergence theorem of Henri Lebesgue. It is a characterization of the convergence in L^{p} in terms of convergence in measure and a condition related to uniform integrability.

== Preliminary definitions ==
Let $(X,\mathcal{A},\mu)$ be a measure space, i.e. $\mu : \mathcal{A}\to [0,\infty]$ is a set function such that $\mu(\emptyset)=0$ and $\mu$ is countably-additive. All functions considered in the sequel will be functions $f:X\to \mathbb{K}$, where $\mathbb{K}=\R$ or $\mathbb{C}$. We adopt the following definitions according to Bogachev's terminology.

- A set of functions $\mathcal{F} \subset L^1(X,\mathcal{A},\mu)$ is called uniformly integrable if $\lim_{M\to+\infty} \sup_{f\in\mathcal{F}} \int_{\{|f|>M\}} |f|\, d\mu = 0$, i.e $\forall\ \varepsilon >0,\ \exists\ M_\varepsilon>0 : \sup_{f\in\mathcal{F}} \int_{\{|f|\geq M_\varepsilon\}} |f|\, d\mu < \varepsilon$.
- A set of functions $\mathcal{F} \subset L^1(X,\mathcal{A},\mu)$ is said to have uniformly absolutely continuous integrals if $\lim_{\mu(A)\to 0}\sup_{f\in\mathcal{F}} \int_A |f|\, d\mu = 0$, i.e. $\forall\ \varepsilon>0,\ \exists\ \delta_\varepsilon >0,\ \forall\ A\in\mathcal{A} : \mu(A)<\delta_\varepsilon \Rightarrow \sup_{f\in \mathcal{F}} \int_A |f|\, d\mu < \varepsilon$. This definition is sometimes used as a definition of uniform integrability. However, it differs from the definition of uniform integrability given above.

When $\mu(X)<\infty$, a set of functions $\mathcal{F} \subset L^1(X,\mathcal{A},\mu)$ is uniformly integrable if and only if it is bounded in $L^1(X,\mathcal{A},\mu)$ and has uniformly absolutely continuous integrals. If, in addition, $\mu$ is atomless, then the uniform integrability is equivalent to the uniform absolute continuity of integrals.

== Finite measure case ==
Let $(X,\mathcal{A},\mu)$ be a measure space with $\mu(X)<\infty$. Let $(f_n)\subset L^p(X,\mathcal{A},\mu)$ and $f$ be an $\mathcal{A}$-measurable function. Then, the following are equivalent :

1. $f\in L^p(X,\mathcal{A},\mu)$ and $(f_n)$ converges to $f$ in $L^p(X,\mathcal{A},\mu)$ ;
2. The sequence of functions $(f_n)$ converges in $\mu$-measure to $f$ and $(|f_n|^p)_{n\geq 1}$ is uniformly integrable ;

For a proof, see Bogachev's monograph "Measure Theory, Volume I".

== Infinite measure case ==
Let $(X,\mathcal{A},\mu)$ be a measure space and $1\leq p<\infty$. Let $(f_n)_{n\geq 1} \subseteq L^p(X,\mathcal{A},\mu)$ and $f\in L^p(X,\mathcal{A},\mu)$. Then, $(f_n)$ converges to $f$ in $L^p(X,\mathcal{A},\mu)$ if and only if the following holds :

1. The sequence of functions $(f_n)$ converges in $\mu$-measure to $f$ ;
2. $(f_n^p)$ has uniformly absolutely continuous integrals;
3. For every $\varepsilon>0$, there exists $X_\varepsilon\in \mathcal{A}$ such that $\mu(X_\varepsilon)<\infty$ and $\sup_{n\geq 1}\int_{X\setminus X_\varepsilon} |f_n|^p\, d\mu <\varepsilon.$

When $\mu(X)<\infty$, the third condition becomes superfluous (one can simply take $X_\varepsilon = X$) and the first two conditions give the usual form of Lebesgue-Vitali's convergence theorem originally stated for measure spaces with finite measure. In this case, one can show that conditions 1 and 2 imply that the sequence $(|f_n|^p)_{n\geq 1}$ is uniformly integrable.

== Converse of the theorem ==
Let $(X,\mathcal{A},\mu)$ be measure space. Let $(f_n)_{n\geq 1} \subseteq L^1(X,\mathcal{A},\mu)$ and assume that $\lim_{n\to\infty}\int_A f_n\,d\mu$ exists for every $A\in\mathcal{A}$. Then, the sequence $(f_n)$ is bounded in $L^1(X,\mathcal{A},\mu)$ and has uniformly absolutely continuous integrals. In addition, there exists $f\in L^1(X,\mathcal{A},\mu)$ such that $\lim_{n\to\infty}\int_A f_n\,d\mu = \int_A f\, d\mu$ for every $A\in\mathcal{A}$.

When $\mu(X)<\infty$, this implies that $(f_n)$ is uniformly integrable.

For a proof, see Bogachev's monograph "Measure Theory, Volume I".
