= Fréchet–Kolmogorov theorem =

Gives condition for a set of functions to be relatively compact in an Lp space

In functional analysis, the Fréchet–Kolmogorov theorem (the names of Riesz or Weil are sometimes added as well) gives a necessary and sufficient condition for a set of functions to be relatively compact in an L^{p} space. It can be thought of as an L^{p} version of the Arzelà–Ascoli theorem, from which it can be deduced. The theorem is named after Maurice René Fréchet and Andrey Kolmogorov.

== Statement ==
Let $B$ be a subset of $L^p(\mathbb{R}^n)$ with $p\in[1,\infty)$, and let $\tau_h f$ denote the translation of $f$ by $h$, that is, $\tau_h f(x)=f(x-h) .$

The subset $B$ is relatively compact if and only if the following properties hold:

1. (Equicontinuous) $\lim_{|h|\to 0}\Vert\tau_h f-f\Vert_{L^p(\mathbb{R}^n)} = 0$ uniformly on $B$.
2. (Equitight) $\lim_{r\to\infty}\int_{|x|>r}\left|f\right|^p=0$ uniformly on $B$.

The first property can be stated as $\forall \varepsilon >0 \, \, \exists \delta >0$ such that $\Vert\tau_h f-f\Vert_{L^p(\mathbb{R}^n)} < \varepsilon \, \, \forall f \in B, \forall h$ with $|h|<\delta .$

Usually, the Fréchet–Kolmogorov theorem is formulated with the extra assumption that $B$ is bounded (i.e., $\Vert f\Vert_{L^p(\mathbb{R}^n)}<\infty$ uniformly on $B$). However, it has been shown that equitightness and equicontinuity imply this property.

=== Special case ===
For a subset $B$ of $L^p(\Omega)$, where $\Omega$ is a bounded subset of $\mathbb{R}^n$, the condition of equitightness is not needed. Hence, a necessary and sufficient condition for $B$ to be relatively compact is that the property of equicontinuity holds. However, this property must be interpreted with care as the below example shows.

== Examples ==
=== Existence of solutions of a PDE ===
Let $(u_\epsilon)_\epsilon$ be a sequence of solutions of the viscous Burgers equation posed in $\mathbb{R}\times(0,T)$:

$$\frac{\partial u}{\partial t} + \frac{1}{2}\frac{\partial u^2}{\partial x} = \epsilon\Delta u, \quad u(x,0) = u_0(x),$$

with $u_0$ smooth enough. If the solutions $(u_\epsilon)_\epsilon$ enjoy the $L^1$-contraction and $L^\infty$-bound properties, we will show existence of solutions of the inviscid Burgers equation

$$\frac{\partial u}{\partial t} + \frac{1}{2}\frac{\partial u^2}{\partial x} = 0, \quad u(x,0) = u_0(x).$$

The first property can be stated as follows: If $u,v$ are solutions of the Burgers equation with $u_0,v_0$ as initial data, then

$$\int_{\mathbb{R}}|u(x,t)-v(x,t)|dx\leq \int_{\mathbb{R}}|u_0(x)-v_0(x)|dx.$$

The second property simply means that $\Vert u(\cdot,t)\Vert_{L^\infty(\mathbb{R})}\leq \Vert u_0\Vert_{L^\infty(\mathbb{R})}$.

Now, let $K\subset\mathbb{R}\times(0,T)$ be any compact set, and define

$$w_\epsilon(x,t):=u_\epsilon(x,t)\mathbf{1}_K(x,t),$$

where $\mathbf{1}_K$ is $1$ on the set $K$ and 0 otherwise. Automatically, $B:=\{(w_\epsilon)_\epsilon\}\subset L^1(\mathbb{R}^2)$ since

$$\int_{\mathbb{R}^2}|w_\epsilon(x,t)|dx dt= \int_{\mathbb{R}^2}|u_\epsilon(x,t)\mathbf{1}_K(x,t)|dx dt\leq \Vert u_0\Vert_{L^\infty(\mathbb{R})}|K|<\infty.$$

Equicontinuity is a consequence of the $L^1$-contraction since $u_\epsilon(x-h,t)$ is a solution of the Burgers equation with $u_0(x-h)$ as initial data and since the $L^\infty$-bound holds: We have that

$$\Vert w_\epsilon(\cdot-h,\cdot-h)-w_\epsilon\Vert_{L^1(\mathbb{R}^2)}\leq \Vert w_\epsilon(\cdot-h,\cdot-h)-w_\epsilon(\cdot,\cdot-h)\Vert_{L^1(\mathbb{R}^2)}+\Vert w_\epsilon(\cdot,\cdot-h)-w_\epsilon\Vert_{L^1(\mathbb{R}^2)}.$$

We continue by considering

$$\begin{align}
&\Vert w_\epsilon(\cdot-h,\cdot-h)-w_\epsilon(\cdot,\cdot-h)\Vert_{L^1(\mathbb{R}^2)}\\
&\leq \Vert (u_\epsilon(\cdot-h,\cdot-h)-u_\epsilon(\cdot,\cdot-h))\mathbf{1}_K(\cdot-h,\cdot-h)\Vert_{L^1(\mathbb{R}^2)}+\Vert u_\epsilon(\cdot,\cdot-h)(\mathbf{1}_K(\cdot-h,\cdot-h)-\mathbf{1}_K(\cdot,\cdot-h)\Vert_{L^1(\mathbb{R}^2)}.
\end{align}$$

The first term on the right-hand side satisfies

$$\Vert (u_\epsilon(\cdot-h,\cdot-h)-u_\epsilon(\cdot,\cdot-h))\mathbf{1}_K(\cdot-h,\cdot-h)\Vert_{L^1(\mathbb{R}^2)}\leq T\Vert u_0(\cdot-h)-u_0\Vert_{L^1(\mathbb{R})}$$

by a change of variable and the $L^1$-contraction. The second term satisfies

$$\Vert u_\epsilon(\cdot,\cdot-h)(\mathbf{1}_K(\cdot-h,\cdot-h)-\mathbf{1}_K(\cdot,\cdot-h))\Vert_{L^1(\mathbb{R}^2)}\leq \Vert u_0\Vert_{L^\infty(\mathbb{R})}\Vert \mathbf{1}_K(\cdot-h,\cdot)-\mathbf{1}_K\Vert_{L^1(\mathbb{R}^2)}$$

by a change of variable and the $L^\infty$-bound. Moreover,

$$\Vert w_\epsilon(\cdot,\cdot-h)-w_\epsilon\Vert_{L^1(\mathbb{R}^2)}\leq \Vert (u_\epsilon(\cdot,\cdot-h)-u_\epsilon)\mathbf{1}_K(\cdot,\cdot-h)\Vert_{L^1(\mathbb{R}^2)}+\Vert u_\epsilon(\mathbf{1}_K(\cdot,\cdot-h)-\mathbf{1}_K)\Vert_{L^1(\mathbb{R}^2)}.$$

Both terms can be estimated as before when noticing that the time equicontinuity follows again by the $L^1$-contraction. The continuity of the translation mapping in $L^1$ then gives equicontinuity uniformly on $B$.

Equitightness holds by definition of $(w_\epsilon)_\epsilon$ by taking $r$ big enough.

Hence, $B$ is relatively compact in $L^1(\mathbb{R}^2)$, and then there is a convergent subsequence of $(u_\epsilon)_\epsilon$ in $L^1(K)$. By a covering argument, the last convergence is in $L_{loc}^1(\mathbb{R}\times(0,T))$.

To conclude existence, it remains to check that the limit function, as $\epsilon\to0^+$, of a subsequence of $(u_\epsilon)_\epsilon$ satisfies

$$\frac{\partial u}{\partial t} + \frac{1}{2}\frac{\partial u^2}{\partial x} = 0, \quad u(x,0) = u_0(x).$$

== See also ==
- Arzelà–Ascoli theorem
- Helly's selection theorem
- Rellich–Kondrachov theorem

== Literature ==
- Brezis, Haïm (2010). Functional analysis, Sobolev spaces, and partial differential equations. Universitext. Springer. p. 111. ISBN 978-0-387-70913-0.
- Riesz, Marcel (1933). "Sur les ensembles compacts de fonctions sommables" (PDF). Acta Sci. Math. 6: 136–142.
- Precup, Radu (2002). Methods in nonlinear integral equations. Springer. p. 21. ISBN 978-1-4020-0844-3.
