= Density topology =

In mathematics, the density topology on the real numbers is a topology on the real line that is different (strictly finer), but in some ways analogous, to the usual topology. It is sometimes used in real analysis to express or relate properties of the Lebesgue measure in topological terms.

== Definition ==
Let $U \subseteq \mathbb{R}$ be a Lebesgue-measurable set. By the Lebesgue density theorem, almost every point $x$ of $U$ is a density point of $U$, i.e., satisfies

$$\frac{\lambda(U \, \cap \, (x-h,x+h))}{2h} \ \underset{h \to 0^+}{\longrightarrow} \ 1$$

where $\lambda$ is the Lebesgue measure and $(x-h,x+h)$ is the open interval of length $2h$ centered at $x$.

When all points of $U$ are density points of $U$, it is said to be density open.

It can be shown that the density open sets of $\mathbb{R}$ form a topology (in other words, they are stable under arbitrary unions and finite intersections): this constitutes the density topology.

== Examples ==
Every open set in the usual topology of $\mathbb{R}$ (i.e., a union of open intervals) is density open, but the converse is not true. For example, the subset $\mathbb{R} \setminus \{1/n : n > 0\}$ is not open in the usual sense (since every open neighborhood of 0 contains some $1/n$ and is thus not contained in the set), but it is density open (the only problematic point being 0 and the set has density 1 at 0). More generally, any subset of full measure is density open. This includes, for example, the complements of $\mathbb{Q}$ and the Cantor set.

Less trivially, and perhaps more instructively, let us show that the set $U := \mathbb{R} \setminus \bigcup_{n=1}^{+\infty} \left[\frac{1}{n}, \frac{1}{n}+\frac{1}{2^n}\right]$ (which, again, is not open in the usual topology) is density open. Again, at every point $x\in U$ other than 0 this is clear because it is even neighborhood of x for the usual topology, so the only point to consider is 0. But if $h>0$ and we let $k := \left\lfloor\frac{1}{h}\right\rfloor$, then each interval $\left[\frac{1}{n}, \frac{1}{n}+\frac{1}{2^n}\right]$ that intersects $(-h,h)$ has $n>k$ so their total measure is $\leq 2^{-k}$, and $\frac{\lambda((-h,+h) \setminus U)}{2h} \leq \frac{2^{-k}}{2h} \leq \frac{2^{-1/h}}{h} \underset{h \to 0^+}{\longrightarrow} 0$ proving that 0 is indeed a density point of U.

== Properties ==
Let $\mathbb{R}_{\mathrm{d}}$ denote the real line endowed with the density topology.

- Like $\mathbb{R}$ with the usual topology, $\mathbb{R}_{\mathrm{d}}$ is a Hausdorff (T_{2}) and Tychonoff (T_{3 1/2}) topological space but unlike the usual topology, it is not normal (T_{4}).
- A subset $Y \subseteq \mathbb{R}_{\mathrm{d}}$ is nowhere dense (for the density topology) iff it is meagre (ditto) iff it is closed and discrete (ditto) iff it is a null set (in the sense of Lebesgue measure).
- The Borel subsets of $\mathbb{R}_{\mathrm{d}}$ (for the density topology) are precisely the Lebesgue-measurable sets; and the complete Boolean algebra of regular open sets of $\mathbb{R}_{\mathrm{d}}$ can be identified with the "reduced measure algebra", i.e., the Boolean algebra of Lebesgue-measurable sets modulo null sets.
- Like $\mathbb{R}$ with the usual topology, $\mathbb{R}_{\mathrm{d}}$ is connected.
- Like $\mathbb{R}$ with the usual topology, $\mathbb{R}_{\mathrm{d}}$ is a Baire space; in fact, unlike the usual topology, it is even hereditarily Baire in the sense that every subspace of $\mathbb{R}_{\mathrm{d}}$ is a Baire space.
- The compact subspaces of $\mathbb{R}_{\mathrm{d}}$ are precisely its finite subsets.
- The approximately continuous functions $f\colon \mathbb{R}\to\mathbb{R}$ are precisely the continuous functions $f : \mathbb{R}_{\mathrm{d}}\to\mathbb{R}$ (i.e., placing the density topology at the source but the usual topology at the target).
