= Approximate limit =

Concept in mathematics

In mathematics, the approximate limit is a generalization of the ordinary limit for real-valued functions of several real variables.

A function f on $\mathbb{R}^k$ has an approximate limit y at a point x if there exists a set F that has density 1 at the point such that if x_{n} is a sequence in F that converges towards x then f(x_{n}) converges towards y.

== Properties ==
The approximate limit of a function, if it exists, is unique. If f has an ordinary limit at x then it also has an approximate limit with the same value.

We denote the approximate limit of f at x_{0} by $\lim_{x \rightarrow x_0} \operatorname{ap} \ f(x).$

Many of the properties of the ordinary limit are also true for the approximate limit.

In particular, if a is a scalar and f and g are functions, the following equations are true if values on the right-hand side are well-defined (that is the approximate limits exist and in the last equation the approximate limit of g is non-zero.)

$$\begin{align}
\lim_{x \rightarrow x_0} \operatorname{ap} \ a\cdot f(x) & =a \cdot \lim_{x \rightarrow x_0} \operatorname{ap} \ f(x) \\
\lim_{x \rightarrow x_0} \operatorname{ap} \ (f(x)+g(x)) & = \lim_{x \rightarrow x_0} \operatorname{ap} \ f(x) + \lim_{x \rightarrow x_0} \operatorname{ap} \ g(x) \\
\lim_{x \rightarrow x_0} \operatorname{ap} \ (f(x)-g(x)) & = \lim_{x \rightarrow x_0} \operatorname{ap} \ f(x)-\lim_{x \rightarrow x_0} \operatorname{ap} \  g(x) \\
\lim_{x \rightarrow x_0} \operatorname{ap} \ (f(x)\cdot g(x)) & = \lim_{x \rightarrow x_0} \operatorname{ap} \ f(x) \cdot \lim_{x \rightarrow x_{0}} \operatorname{ap} \ g(x) \\
\lim_{x \rightarrow x_0} \operatorname{ap} \ (f(x)/g(x)) & = \lim_{x \rightarrow x_0} \operatorname{ap} \ f(x) / \lim_{x \rightarrow x_0} \operatorname{ap} \ g(x)
\end{align}$$

== Approximate continuity and differentiability ==
If

$$\lim_{x \rightarrow x_0} \operatorname{ap} \ f(x) = f(x_0)$$

then f is said to be approximately continuous at x_{0}. If f is function of only one real variable and the difference quotient

$$\frac{f(x_0+h)-f(x_0)}{h}$$

has an approximate limit as h approaches zero we say that f has an approximate derivative at x_{0}. It turns out that approximate differentiability implies approximate continuity, in perfect analogy with ordinary continuity and differentiability.

It also turns out that the usual rules for the derivative of a sum, difference, product and quotient have straightforward generalizations to the approximate derivative. There is no generalization of the chain rule that is true in general however.
