= Uniform integrability =

Mathematical concept

In mathematics, uniform integrability is an important concept in real analysis, functional analysis and measure theory, and plays a vital role in the theory of martingales.

== Measure-theoretic definition ==
Uniform integrability is an extension to the notion of a family of functions being dominated in $L^1$ which is central in dominated convergence. Several textbooks on real analysis and measure theory use the following definition:

Definition A: Let $(X,\mathfrak{M}, \mu)$ be a positive measure space. A set $\Phi\subset L^1(\mu)$ is called uniformly integrable if $\sup_{f\in\Phi}\|f\|_{L^1(\mu)}<\infty$, and to each $\varepsilon>0$ there corresponds a $\delta>0$ such that

$$\int_E |f| \, d\mu  < \varepsilon$$

whenever $f \in \Phi$ and $\mu(E)<\delta.$

Definition A is rather restrictive for infinite measure spaces. A more general definition of uniform integrability that works well in general measure spaces was introduced by G. A. Hunt.

Definition H: Let $(X,\mathfrak{M},\mu)$ be a positive measure space. A set $\Phi\subset L^1(\mu)$ is called uniformly integrable if and only if

$$\inf_{g\in L^1_+(\mu)}\sup_{f\in\Phi}\int_{\{|f|>g\}}|f|\, d\mu=0$$

where $L^1_+(\mu)=\{g\in L^1(\mu): g\geq0\}$.

Since Hunt's definition is equivalent to Definition A when the underlying measure space is finite (see Theorem 2 below), Definition H is widely adopted in Mathematics.

The following result provides another equivalent notion to Hunt's. This equivalency is sometimes given as definition for uniform integrability.

Theorem 1: If $(X,\mathfrak{M},\mu)$ is a (positive) finite measure space, then a set $\Phi\subset L^1(\mu)$ is uniformly integrable if and only if

$$\inf_{g\in L^1_+(\mu)}\sup_{f\in\Phi}\int (|f|- g)^+ \, d\mu=0$$

If in addition $\mu(X)<\infty$, then uniform integrability is equivalent to either of the following conditions

1. $\inf_{a>0}\sup_{f\in \Phi}\int(|f|-a)_+\,d\mu =0$.

2. $\inf_{a>0}\sup_{f\in \Phi}\int_{\{|f|>a\}}|f|\,d\mu=0$

When the underlying space $(X,\mathfrak{M},\mu)$ is $\sigma$-finite, Hunt's definition is equivalent to the following:

Theorem 2: Let $(X,\mathfrak{M},\mu)$ be a $\sigma$-finite measure space, and $h\in L^1(\mu)$ be such that $h>0$ almost everywhere. A set $\Phi\subset L^1(\mu)$ is uniformly integrable if and only if $\sup_{f\in\Phi}\|f\|_{L^1(\mu)}<\infty$, and for any $\varepsilon>0$, there exists $\delta>0$ such that

$$\sup_{f\in\Phi}\int_A|f|\, d\mu <\varepsilon$$

whenever $\int_A h\,d\mu <\delta$.

A consequence of Theorems 1 and 2 is that equivalence of Definitions A and H for finite measures follows. Indeed, the statement in Definition A is obtained by taking $h\equiv1$ in Theorem 2.

== Tightness, boundedness, equi-integrability and uniform integrability ==
Another concept associated with uniform integrability is that of tightness. In this article tightness is taken in a more general setting.

Definition: Suppose $(X,\mathfrak{M},\mu)$ is a measure space. Let $\mathcal{K}\subset\mathfrak{M}$ be a collection of sets of finite measure. A family $\Phi\subset L^1(\mu)$ is said to be tight with respect to $\mathcal{K}$ if

$$\inf_{K\in\mathcal{K}}\sup_{f\in\Phi}\int_{X\setminus K}|f|\,d\mu=0$$

When $\mathcal{K}=\mathfrak{M}\cap L^1(\mu)$, $\Phi$ is simply said to be tight.

When the measure space $(X,\mathfrak{M},\mu)$ is a metric space equipped with the Borel $\sigma$ algebra, $\mu$ is a regular measure, and $\mathcal{K}$ is the collection of all compact subsets of $X$, the notion of $\mathcal{K}$-tightness discussed above coincides with the well known concept of tightness used in the analysis of regular measures in metric spaces

For $\sigma$-finite measure spaces, it can be shown that if a family $\Phi\subset L^1(\mu)$ is uniformly integrable, then $\Phi$ is tight. This is captured by the following result which is often used as definition of uniform integrability in the analysis literature:

Theorem 3: Suppose $(X,\mathfrak{M},\mu)$ is a $\sigma$-finite measure space. A family $\Phi\subset L^1(\mu)$ is uniformly integrable if and only if

1. $\sup_{f\in\Phi}\|f\|_1<\infty$.
2. $\inf_{a>0}\sup_{f\in \Phi}\int_{\{|f|>a\}}|f|\,d\mu=0$
3. $\Phi$ is tight.

When $\mu(X)<\infty$, condition 3 is redundant (see Theorem 1 above).

In many books in analysis, condition 2 in Theorem 3 is often replaced by another condition called equi-integrability:

Definition: A family $\mathcal{C}$ of complex or real valued measurable functions is equi-integrable (or uniformly absolutely continuous with respect to a measure $\mu$) if for any $\varepsilon>0$ there is $\delta>0$ such that
$$\sup_{f\in\mathcal{C}}\int_A|f|\,d\mu<\varepsilon \qquad\text{whenever}\qquad \mu(A)<\delta$$

Theorem 3 then says that equi-integrability together with $L^1$ boundedness and tightness (conditions (1) and (3) in Theorem 3) is equivalent to uniform integrability.

== Relevant theorems ==
The following theorems describe very useful criteria for uniform integrability which have many applications in Analysis and Probability.

de la Vallée-Poussin theorem

Suppose $(X,\mathfrak{M},\mu)$ is a finite measure space. The family $\mathcal{F} \subset L^1(\mu)$ is uniformly integrable if and only if there exists a function $G:[0,\infty)\rightarrow[0,\infty)$ such that $\lim_{t \to \infty} \frac{G(t)} t = \infty$ and
$$\sup_{f\in\mathcal{F}} \int_X G(|f|)\,d\mu < \infty.$$
The function $G$ can be chosen to be monotone increasing and convex.

Uniform integrability gives a characterization of weak compactness in $L^1$.

Dunford–Pettis theorem

Suppose $(X,\mathfrak{M},\mu)$ is a $\sigma$-finite measure. A family $\mathcal{F}\subset L^1(\mu)$ has compact closure in the weak topology $\sigma(L^1,L^\infty)$ if and only if $\mathcal{F}$ is uniformly integrable.

== Probability definition ==
In probability theory, Definition A or the statement of Theorem 1 are often presented as definitions of uniform integrability using the notation expectation of random variables., that is,

1. A class $\mathcal{C}$ of random variables is called uniformly integrable if:

- There exists a finite $M$ such that, for every $X$ in $\mathcal{C}$, $\operatorname E(|X|)\leq M$ and
- For every $\varepsilon > 0$ there exists $\delta > 0$ such that, for every measurable $A$ such that $P(A)\leq \delta$ and every $X$ in $\mathcal{C}$, $\operatorname E(|X|I_A)\leq\varepsilon$.

or alternatively

2. A class $\mathcal{C}$ of random variables is called uniformly integrable (UI) if for every $\varepsilon > 0$ there exists $K\in[0,\infty)$ such that $\operatorname E(|X|I_{|X|\geq K})\le\varepsilon\ \text{ for all } X \in \mathcal{C}$, where $I_{|X|\geq K}$ is the indicator function
$$I_{|X|\geq K} = \begin{cases} 1 &\text{if } |X|\geq K, \\ 0 &\text{if } |X| < K. \end{cases}$$.

== Related corollaries ==
The following results apply to the probabilistic definition.

- Definition 1 could be rewritten by taking the limits as
  $$\lim_{K \to \infty} \sup_{X \in \mathcal{C}} \operatorname  E(|X|\,I_{|X|\geq K})=0.$$
- A non-UI sequence. Let $\Omega = [0,1] \subset \mathbb{R}$, and define
  $$X_n(\omega) = \begin{cases}
n, & \omega\in (0,1/n), \\
0 , & \text{otherwise.} \end{cases}$$
  Clearly $X_n\in L^1$, and indeed $\operatorname E(|X_n|)=1\ ,$ for all n. However,
  $$\operatorname E(|X_n| I_{\{|X_n|\ge K \}})= 1\ \text{ for all } n \ge K,$$
  and comparing with definition 1, it is seen that the sequence is not uniformly integrable.

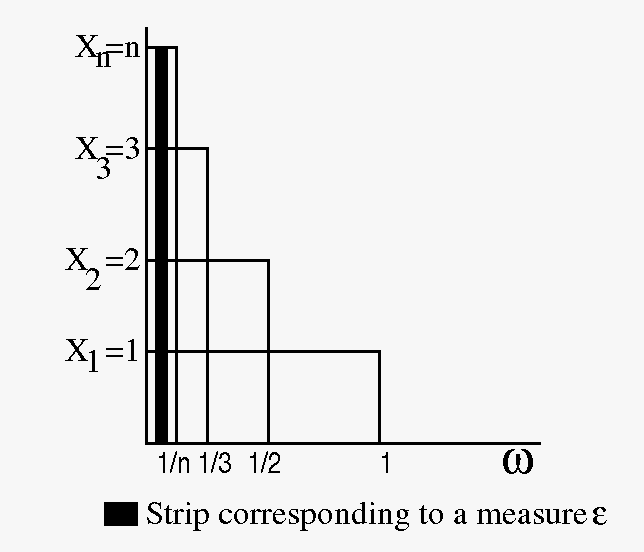
Non-UI sequence of RVs. The area under the strip is always equal to 1, but $X_n \to 0$ pointwise.

- By using Definition 2 in the above example, it can be seen that the first clause is satisfied as $L^1$ norm of all $X_n$s are 1 i.e., bounded. But the second clause does not hold as given any $\delta$ positive, there is an interval $(0, 1/n)$ with measure less than $\delta$ and $E[|X_m|: (0, 1/n)] =1$ for all $m \ge n$.
- If $X$ is a UI random variable, by splitting
  $$\operatorname E(|X|) = \operatorname E(|X| I_{\{|X| \geq K \}})+\operatorname E(|X| I_{\{|X| < K \}})$$
  and bounding each of the two, it can be seen that a uniformly integrable random variable is always bounded in $L^1$.
- If any sequence of random variables $X_n$ is dominated by an integrable, non-negative $Y$: that is, for all ω and n,
  $$|X_n(\omega)| \le Y(\omega),\ Y(\omega)\ge 0,\ \operatorname E(Y) < \infty,$$
  then the class $\mathcal{C}$ of random variables $\{X_n\}$ is uniformly integrable.
- A class of random variables bounded in $L^p$ ($p > 1$) is uniformly integrable.

== Uniform integrability and stochastic ordering ==
A family of random variables $\{X_i\}_{i \in I}$ is uniformly integrable if and only if there exists a random variable $X$ such that $E X < \infty$ and $|X_i| \le_\mathrm{icx} X$ for all $i \in I$, where $\le_\mathrm{icx}$ denotes the increasing convex stochastic order defined by $A \le_\mathrm{icx} B$ if $E \phi(A) \le E \phi(B)$ for all nondecreasing convex real functions $\phi$.

== Relation to convergence of random variables ==
A sequence $\{X_n\}$ converges to $X$ in the $L^1$ norm if and only if it converges in measure to $X$ and it is uniformly integrable. In probability terms, a sequence of random variables converging in probability also converge in the mean if and only if they are uniformly integrable. This is a generalization of Lebesgue's dominated convergence theorem, see Vitali convergence theorem.
