= Coarse function =

In mathematics, coarse functions are functions that may appear to be continuous at a distance, but in reality are not necessarily continuous. Although continuous functions are usually observed on a small scale, coarse functions are usually observed on a large scale.

== See also ==
- Coarse structure
