= Integrally convex set =

An integrally convex set is the discrete geometry analogue of the concept of convex set in geometry.

A subset X of the integer grid $\mathbb{Z}^n$ is integrally convex if any point y in the convex hull of X can be expressed as a convex combination of the points of X that are "near" y, where "near" means that the distance between each two coordinates is less than 1.

== Definitions ==
Let X be a subset of $\mathbb{Z}^n$.

Denote by ch(X) the convex hull of X. Note that ch(X) is a subset of $\mathbb{R}^n$, since it contains all the real points that are convex combinations of the integer points in X.

For any point y in $\mathbb{R}^n$, denote near(y) := {z in $\mathbb{Z}^n$ | |z_{i} - y_{i}| < 1 for all i in {1,...,n} }. These are the integer points that are considered "nearby" to the real point y.

A subset X of $\mathbb{Z}^n$ is called integrally convex if every point y in ch(X) is also in ch(X ∩ near(y)).

== Example ==
Non-integrally convex set

Let n = 2 and let X = { (0,0), (1,0), (2,0), (2,1) }. Its convex hull ch(X) contains, for example, the point y = (1.2, 0.5).

The integer points nearby y are near(y) = {(1,0), (2,0), (1,1), (2,1) }. So X ∩ near(y) = {(1,0), (2,0), (2,1)}. But y is not in ch(X ∩ near(y)). See image at the right.

Therefore X is not integrally convex.

In contrast, the set Y = { (0,0), (1,0), (2,0), (1,1), (2,1) } is integrally convex.

== Properties ==
Iimura, Murota and Tamura have shown the following property of integrally convex set.

Let $X\subset \mathbb{Z}^n$ be a finite integrally convex set. There exists a triangulation of ch(X) that is integral, i.e.:

- The vertices of the triangulation are the vertices of X;
- The vertices of every simplex of the triangulation lie in the same "cell" (hypercube of side-length 1) of the integer grid $\mathbb{Z}^n$.

Integrally convex set

The example set X is not integrally convex, and indeed ch(X) does not admit an integral triangulation: every triangulation of ch(X), either has to add vertices not in X, or has to include simplices that are not contained in a single cell.

In contrast, the set Y = { (0,0), (1,0), (2,0), (1,1), (2,1) } is integrally convex, and indeed admits an integral triangulation, e.g. with the three simplices {(0,0),(1,0),(1,1)} and {(1,0),(2,0),(2,1)} and {(1,0),(1,1),(2,1)}. See image at the right.
