= Relatively compact subspace =

Subset of a topological space whose closure is compact

In mathematics, a relatively compact subspace (or relatively compact subset, or precompact subset) Y of a topological space X is a subset whose closure is compact.

== Properties ==
Every subset of a compact topological space is relatively compact (since a closed subset of a compact space is compact). In an arbitrary topological space every subset of a relatively compact set is relatively compact.

Every compact subset of a Hausdorff space is relatively compact. In a non-Hausdorff space, such as the particular point topology on an infinite set, the closure of a compact subset is not necessarily compact; said differently, a compact subset of a non-Hausdorff space is not necessarily relatively compact.

Every compact subset of a (possibly non-Hausdorff) topological vector space is complete and relatively compact.

In the case of a metric topology, or more generally when sequences may be used to test for compactness, the criterion for relative compactness becomes that any sequence in Y has a subsequence convergent in X.

Some major theorems characterize relatively compact subsets, in particular in function spaces. An example is the Arzelà–Ascoli theorem. Other cases of interest relate to uniform integrability, and the concept of normal family in complex analysis. Mahler's compactness theorem in the geometry of numbers characterizes relatively compact subsets in certain non-compact homogeneous spaces (specifically spaces of lattices).

== Counterexample ==
As a counterexample take any finite neighbourhood of the particular point of an infinite particular point space. The neighbourhood itself is compact but is not relatively compact because its closure is the whole non-compact space.

== Almost periodic functions ==
The definition of an almost periodic function F at a conceptual level has to do with the translates of F being a relatively compact set. This needs to be made precise in terms of the topology used, in a particular theory.

== See also ==
- Compactly embedded
- Totally bounded space
