= Dini =

Dini may refer to:

== Organizations ==
- National Directorate of Intelligence (Peru), the primary intelligence agency in Peru

== Places in Iran ==
- Ala ol Dini-ye Olya, a village in Eslamabad Rural District, in the Central District of Jiroft County, Kerman Province
- Nur ol Dini, a village in Kheyrgu Rural District, Alamarvdasht District, Lamerd County, Fars Province
- Tang-e Baha ol Dini, a village in Howmeh Rural District, in the Central District of Larestan County, Fars Province
- Tolombeh-ye Rokn ol Dini, a village in Arzuiyeh Rural District, in the Central District of Arzuiyeh County, Kerman Province
- Zeyn ol Dini, a village in Kal Rural District, Eshkanan District, Lamerd County, Fars Province

== People ==
- Abdi Dini (born 1981), professional Canadian wheelchair basketball player
- Abdulkadir Sheikh Dini, Somali politician and military official
- Ahmed Dini Ahmed (1932–2004), Djiboutian politician
- Andrea Dini (born 1996), Italian football player
- Antonio Dini (1918–1940), New Zealand flying ace of the Second World War
- Armando Dini (born 1932), Italian Roman Catholic archbishop
- Dino Dini, English games developer
- Joe Dini (1929–2014), Nevada state assemblyman and casino owner
- Lamberto Dini, Italian politician
- Lorenzo Dini (born 1994), Italian long-distance runner
- Mohamed Dini Farah, Djiboutian politician
- Muguette Dini, French politician
- Nh. Dini, Indonesian novelist
- Nick Dini, American baseball player
- Paul Dini, American animation and comic writer
- Pietro Dini (died 1625), Roman Catholic Archbishop of Fermo
- Putu Dini Jasita Utami (born 1994), Indonesian beach volleyball player
- Sandra Dini, Italian high jumper
- Ulisse Dini, Italian mathematician, after which are named:
  - Dini derivative
  - Dini test
  - Dini's theorem
  - Dini criterion
  - Dini's surface
  - Dini continuity
  - Dini–Lipschitz criterion
- Umar Said Salim Al Dini, Yemeni held in extrajudicial detention in the United States Guantanamo Bay detention camps, in Cuba
- Dini Haryati (1978–1998), Indonesian student, victim of an unsolved rape-murder case in Singapore
- Dini Petty (born 1945), Canadian television and radio host

== Other uses ==
- Dini Ya Msambwa, African traditional religion, labeled as an anti-colonial
- DinI-like protein family
- Pernikahan Dini, a soap opera that aired on RCTI in 2001

== See also ==
- Dinis (disambiguation)
- Dino (disambiguation)
