= Dinis (disambiguation) =

Dinis was the sixth King of Portugal and the Algarve.

Dinis may also refer to:

- Dinis (given name), a Portuguese masculine given name
- Dinis (surname), a surname

== See also ==
- Dini (disambiguation)
