= Dinello =

Dinello or DiNello is a surname. Notable people with the surname include:

- Gilbert DiNello (1935–1996), American politician
- Paul Dinello (born 1962), American comedian, actor, writer, director, and producer

== See also ==
- Dinelli
