= Dini test =

In mathematics, the Dini and Dini–Lipschitz tests are highly precise tests that can be used to prove that the Fourier series of a function converges at a given point. These tests are named after Ulisse Dini and Rudolf Lipschitz.

== Definition ==
Let f be a function on [0,2π], let t be some point and let δ be a positive number. We define the local modulus of continuity at the point t by

$$\left.\right.\omega_f(\delta;t)=\max_{|\varepsilon| \le \delta} |f(t)-f(t+\varepsilon)|$$

Notice that we consider here f to be a periodic function, e.g. if t = 0 and ε is negative then we define f(ε) = f(2π + ε).

The global modulus of continuity (or simply the modulus of continuity) is defined by

$$\omega_f(\delta) = \max_t \omega_f(\delta;t)$$

With these definitions we may state the main results:

Theorem (Dini's test): Assume a function f satisfies at a point t that

$$\int_0^\pi \frac{1}{\delta}\omega_f(\delta;t)\,\mathrm{d}\delta < \infty.$$

Then the Fourier series of f converges at t to f(t).

For example, the theorem holds with ω_{f} = log^{−2}(1/δ) but does not hold with log^{−1}(1/δ).

Theorem (the Dini–Lipschitz test): Assume a function f satisfies

$$\omega_f(\delta)=o\left(\log\frac{1}{\delta}\right)^{-1}.$$

Then the Fourier series of f converges uniformly to f.

In particular, any function that obeys a Hölder condition satisfies the Dini–Lipschitz test.

== Precision ==
Both tests are the best of their kind. For the Dini-Lipschitz test, it is possible to construct a function f with its modulus of continuity satisfying the test with O instead of o, i.e.

$$\omega_f(\delta)=O\left(\log\frac{1}{\delta}\right)^{-1}.$$

and the Fourier series of f diverges. For the Dini test, the statement of precision is slightly longer: it says that for any function Ω such that

$$\int_0^\pi \frac{1}{\delta}\Omega(\delta)\,\mathrm{d}\delta = \infty$$

there exists a function f such that

$$\omega_f(\delta;0) < \Omega(\delta)$$

and the Fourier series of f diverges at 0.

== See also ==
- Convergence of Fourier series
- Dini continuity
- Dini criterion
