= Sigeru Mizohata =

Japanese mathematician (1924–2002)

- Born: 30 December 1924; Osaka Prefecture, Japan
- Died: 25 June 2002 (aged 77)
- Education: Kyoto University
- Known for: Lax-Mizohata theorem, Mizohata operator
- Awards: Matsunaga Prize (1966)
- Scientific career
- Fields: Mathematics, Partial Differential Equations
- Workplaces: Kyoto University
- Doctoral advisor: Hiroshi Okamura

Sigeru (Shigeru) Mizohata (Japanese: 溝畑 茂(みぞはた しげる); December 30, 1924 – June 25, 2002) was a Japanese mathematician, who specialized in the theory of partial differential equations.

== Biography ==
Sigeru Mizohata graduated from the Faculty of Science at the Kyoto Imperial University in 1947, where he was studying under Hiroshi Okamura. From 1954 to 1957 he studied in France as an international student; this left a lasting impact, with many of his research papers subsequently published in French. His research interests mainly concerned hyperbolic partial differential equations and the use of functional analysis in the theory of PDEs. He was awarded an honorary doctorate by the University of Paris in 1986.

An observation Mizohata made on some work of Jiro Takeuchi related to the Cauchy problem evolved into the Mizohata-Takeuchi conjecture, to which Hannah Cairo found a counterexample in 2025.

== Books ==
- Mizohata, Sigeru (1979). The Theory of Partial Differential Equations (revised ed.). Cambridge University Press. ISBN 9780521297462.
- Mizohata, Sigeru (1985). On the Cauchy Problem. Notes and Reports in Mathematics in Science and Engineering. Vol. 3. Academic Press, Inc. ISBN 9781483269061.

== Works ==
- Mizohata, Sigeru (1961), "Some remarks on the Cauchy problem", Journal of Mathematics of Kyoto University, 1 (1): 109–127, doi:10.1215/kjm/1250525109
- Mizohata, Sigeru (1962), "Analyticity of the fundamental solutions of hyperbolic systems", Journal of Mathematics of Kyoto University, 1 (3): 327–355, doi:10.1215/kjm/1250525008
- Mizohata, Sigeru (1965). Lectures on Cauchy Problem, Tata Institute of Fundamental Research.
- Mizohata, Sigeru (1974), "On Cauchy-Kowalevski's Theorem; A Necessary Condition", Publications of the Research Institute for Mathematical Sciences, 10 (2): 509–519, doi:10.2977/prims/1195192007
- Mizohata, Sigeru (1981), "On some Schrödinger type equations", Proceedings of the Japan Academy, Series A, Mathematical Sciences, 57 (2): 81–84, doi:10.3792/pjaa.57.81
- Mizohata, Sigeru (1958), "Unicité du prolongement des solutions pour quelques opérateurs différentiels paraboliques", Memoirs of the College of Science, University of Kyoto, Series A: Mathematics, 31 (3): 219–239, doi:10.1215/kjm/1250776858 (in French)
- Mizohata, Sigeru (1962), "Solutions nulles et solutions non analytiques", Journal of Mathematics of Kyoto University, Series A: Mathematics, 1 (2): 271–302, doi:10.1215/kjm/1250525061 (in French)
