= Rudolf Lipschitz =

German mathematician (1832–1903)

Rudolph Lipschitz
- Born: 14 May 1832; Königsberg, Province of Prussia
- Died: 7 October 1903 (aged 71); Bonn, German Empire
- Education: University of Königsberg
- Known for: Lipschitz continuity Lipschitz integral condition Lipschitz quaternion
- Scientific career
- Fields: Mathematics
- Workplaces: University of Bonn
- Doctoral advisor: Gustav Dirichlet; Martin Ohm
- Doctoral students: Felix Klein

Rudolf Otto Sigismund Lipschitz (14 May 1832 – 7 October 1903) was a German mathematician who made contributions to mathematical analysis (where he gave his name to the Lipschitz continuity condition) and differential geometry, as well as number theory, algebras with involution and classical mechanics.

== Biography ==
Rudolf Lipschitz was born on 14 May 1832 in Königsberg. He was the son of a landowner and was raised at his father's estate at Bönkein which was near Königsberg. He entered the University of Königsberg when he was 15, but later moved to the University of Berlin where he studied with Gustav Dirichlet. Despite having his studies delayed by illness, in 1853 Lipschitz graduated with a PhD in Berlin.

After receiving his PhD, Lipschitz started teaching at local Gymnasiums. In 1857 he married Ida Pascha, the daughter of one of the landowners with an estate near to his father's, and earned his habilitation at the University of Bonn, where he remained as a privatdozent. In 1862 Lipschitz became an extraordinary professor at the University of Breslau where he spent the following two years. In 1864 Lipschitz moved back to Bonn as a full professor. He was appointed Bonn's first chair of Mathematics in 1869. He remained there for the rest of his career. Here he examined the dissertation of Felix Klein. Lipschitz died on 7 October 1903 in Bonn.

== Selected publications ==
- Lehrbuch der Analysis (two volumes, Bonn 1877, 1880); erster Band zweiter Band
- Wissenschaft und Staat (Bonn, 1874);
- Untersuchungen über die Summen von Quadraten (Bonn, 1886);
- Bedeutung der theoretischen Mechanik (Berlin, 1876).

== See also ==
- Cauchy–Lipschitz theorem
- Lipschitz domain
- Lipschitz quaternion
- Lipschitz continuity
  - Uniform, Hölder and Lipschitz continuity
- Lipschitz distance
- Lipschitz-continuous maps and contractions
- Concave moduli and Lipschitz approximation
- Dini–Lipschitz criterion
- Dini–Lipschitz test
