= Dinelli =

Dinelli is an Italian surname. Notable people with the surname include:

- Leonardo Martins Dinelli (born 1977), Brazilian footballer
- Mel Dinelli (1912–1991), American writer for theatre, radio, film and magazines
- Oliviero Dinelli (born 1947), Italian actor and voice actor

== See also ==
- Dinelli's doradito, a species of bird in the family Tyrannidae
- Dini (disambiguation)
