= Mizohata–Takeuchi conjecture =

Proposal in harmonic analysis

In harmonic analysis, a branch of mathematics, the Mizohata–Takeuchi conjecture proposed a weighted $L^2$ inequality for the Fourier extension operator associated with a smooth hypersurface in Euclidean space. It asserted that the $L^2$ norm of the extension of a function $f$ from the hypersurface to $\mathbb{R}^n$ could be bounded, for any nonnegative weight function, by a constant multiple of the $L^2$ norm of $f$, with the constant depending only on the supremum of the weight over certain tube-shaped regions. (Note: Here a “tube” means a long, thin cylindrical region in $\mathbb R^n$, typically of fixed radius and arbitrary length, as in the Kakeya problem.) The conjecture was disproved in 2025 by Hannah Cairo.

The conjecture originally arose in the study of well-posedness for dispersive partial differential equations. In the 1970s and 1980s Jiro Takeuchi was studying the initial value problem associated with a perturbed version of the linear Schrödinger equation. He at one point claimed a well-posed condition in $L^2(\mathbb{R}^n)$ that was both necessary and sufficient for the associated Cauchy problem. Sigeru Mizohata noticed that Takeuchi’s argument was not compelling and showed that Takeuchi’s condition is necessary, but whether it is also sufficient remained open.
