= Peano existence theorem =

Theorem regarding the existence of a solution to a differential equation

In mathematics, specifically in the study of ordinary differential equations, the Peano existence theorem, Peano theorem or Cauchy–Peano theorem, named after Giuseppe Peano and Augustin-Louis Cauchy, is a fundamental theorem which guarantees the existence of solutions to certain initial value problems.

== History ==
Peano first published the theorem in 1886 with an incorrect proof. In 1890 he published a new correct proof using successive approximations.

== Theorem ==
Let $D$ be an open subset of $\mathbb{R}\times\mathbb{R}$ with $f\colon D \to \mathbb{R}$ a continuous function and $y'(t) = f\left(t, y(t)\right)$ an explicit first-order differential equation defined on D, then every initial value problem $y\left(t_0\right) = y_0$ for f with $(t_0, y_0) \in D$ has a local solution $z\colon I \to \mathbb{R}$ where $I$ is a neighbourhood of $t_0$ in $\mathbb{R}$, such that $z'(t) = f\left(t, z(t)\right)$ for all $t \in I$.

The solution need not be unique: one and the same initial value $(t_0, y_0)$ may give rise to many different solutions $z$.

== Proof ==
By replacing $y$ with $y-y_0$, $t$ with $t-t_0$, we may assume $t_0=y_0=0$. As $D$ is open there is a rectangle $R=[-t_1,t_1]\times[-y_1,y_1]\subset D$.

Because $R$ is compact and $f$ is continuous, we have $\textstyle\sup_R|f|\le C<\infty$ and by the Stone–Weierstrass theorem there exists a sequence of Lipschitz functions $f_k:R\to\mathbb{R}$ converging uniformly to $f$ in $R$. Without loss of generality, we assume $\textstyle\sup_R|f_k|\le2C$ for all $k$.

We define Picard iterations $y_{k,n}:I=[-t_2,t_2]\to\mathbb{R}$ as follows, where $t_2=\min\{t_1,y_1/(2C)\}$. $y_{k,0}(t)\equiv0$, and $\textstyle y_{k,n+1}(t)=\int_0^t f_k(t',y_{k,n}(t'))\,\mathrm{d}t'$. They are well-defined by induction: as

$$\begin{aligned}|y_{k,n+1}(t)|&=\textstyle\left|\int_0^t f_k(t',y_{k,n}(t')) \,\mathrm{d}t'\right|\\&\le\textstyle\int_0^t|f_k(t',y_{k,n}(t'))|\,\mathrm{d}t'\\&\le \textstyle |t|\sup_R|f_k|\\&\le t_2\cdot2C\le y_1,\end{aligned}$$

$(t',y_{k,n+1}(t'))$ is within the domain of $f_k$.

We have

$$\begin{aligned}|y_{k,n+1}(t)-y_{k,n}(t)|&=\textstyle\left|\int_0^t f_k(t',y_{k,n}(t'))-f_k(t',y_{k,n-1}(t'))\,\mathrm{d}t'\right|\\&\le\textstyle\int_0^t|f_k(t',y_{k,n}(t'))-f_k(t',y_{k,n-1}(t'))|\,\mathrm{d}t'\\&\le \textstyle L_k \int_0^t|y_{k,n}(t')-y_{k,n-1}(t')|\,\mathrm{d}t',\end{aligned}$$

where $L_k$ is the Lipschitz constant of $f_k$. Thus for maximal difference $\textstyle M_{k,n}(t)=\sup_{t'\in[0,t]}|y_{k,n+1}(t')-y_{k,n}(t')|$, we have a bound $\textstyle M_{k,n}(t)\le L_k \int_0^t M_{k,n-1}(t')\,\mathrm{d}t'$, and

$$\begin{aligned}M_{k,0}(t)&\le\textstyle\int_0^t|f_k(t',0)|\,\mathrm{d}t'\\&\le |t|\textstyle\sup_R|f_k|\le 2C|t|.\end{aligned}$$

By induction, this implies the bound $M_{k,n}(t)\le 2CL_k^n|t|^{n+1}/(n+1)!$ which tends to zero as $n\to\infty$ for all $t\in I$.

The functions $y_{k,n}$ are equicontinuous as for $-t_2\le t<t'\le t_2$ we have

$$\begin{aligned}|y_{k,n+1}(t')-y_{k,n+1}(t)|&\le\textstyle\int_t^{t'}|f_k(t'',y_{k,n}(t''))|\,\mathrm{d}t''\\&\textstyle\le|t'-t|\sup_R|f_k|\le 2C|t'-t|,\end{aligned}$$

so by the Arzelà–Ascoli theorem they are relatively compact. In particular, for each $k$ there is a subsequence $(y_{k,\varphi_k(n)})_{n\in\mathbb{N}}$ converging uniformly to a continuous function $y_k:I\to\mathbb{R}$. Taking limit $n\to\infty$ in

$$\begin{aligned}\textstyle \left|y_{k,\varphi_k(n)}(t)-\int_0^xf_k(t',y_{k,\varphi_k(n)}(t'))\,\mathrm{d}t'\right|&=|y_{k,\varphi_k(n)}(t)-y_{k,\varphi_k(n)+1}(t)|\\&\le M_{k,\varphi_k(n)}(t_2)\end{aligned}$$

we conclude that $\textstyle y_k (t) = \int_0^t f_k(t', y_k(t')) \, \mathrm{d}t'$. The functions $y_k$ are in the closure of a relatively compact set, so they are themselves relatively compact. Thus there is a subsequence $y_{\psi(k)}$ converging uniformly to a continuous function $z:I\to\mathbb{R}$. Taking limit $k\to\infty$ in $\textstyle y_{\psi(k)}(t)=\int_0^t f_{\psi(k)}(t',y_{\psi(k)}(t'))\,\mathrm{d}t'$ we conclude that $\textstyle z(t)=\int_0^t f(t',z(t'))\,\mathrm{d}t'$, using the fact that $f_{\psi(k)}$ are equicontinuous by the Arzelà–Ascoli theorem. By the fundamental theorem of calculus, $z'(t) = f(t, z(t))$ in $I$.

== Related theorems ==
The Peano theorem can be compared with another existence result in the same context, the Picard–Lindelöf theorem. The Picard–Lindelöf theorem both assumes more and concludes more. It requires Lipschitz continuity, while the Peano theorem requires only continuity; but it proves both existence and uniqueness where the Peano theorem proves only the existence of solutions. To illustrate, consider the ordinary differential equation

$y' = \left\vert y\right\vert^{\frac{1}{2}}$ on the domain $\left[0, 1\right].$

According to the Peano theorem, this equation has solutions, but the Picard–Lindelöf theorem does not apply since the right hand side is not Lipschitz continuous in any neighbourhood containing 0. Thus we can conclude existence but not uniqueness. It turns out that this ordinary differential equation has two kinds of solutions when starting at $y(0)=0$, either $y(t)=0$ or $y(t)=t^2/4$. The transition between $y=0$ and $y=(t-C)^2/4$ can happen at any $C$.

The Carathéodory existence theorem is a generalization of the Peano existence theorem with weaker conditions than continuity.

The Peano existence theorem cannot be straightforwardly extended to a general Hilbert space $\mathcal{H}$: for an open subset $D$ of $\mathbb{R}\times \mathcal{H}$, the continuity of $f\colon D \to \mathbb{R}$ alone is insufficient for guaranteeing the existence of solutions for the associated initial value problem.
