= Fourier extension operator =

Informally, the Fourier extension operator is an operator that takes a function defined on the surface of the unit sphere in $\mathbb R^n$ and applies the inverse Fourier transform to produce a function on the entirety of $\mathbb R^n$.

== Definition ==
Formally, it is an operator $g \mapsto \widehat{g \, d\sigma}$ such that
$$\widehat{g \, d\sigma}(x) = \int_{S^{n-1}} e^{ix \cdot \xi} g(\xi) \, d\sigma(\xi)$$
where $d\sigma$ denotes surface measure on the unit sphere $S^{n-1}$, $x \in \mathbb R^n$, and $g \in L^p(\mathbb R^n)$ for some $p \ge 1$. Here, the notation $\widehat{f}$ denotes the fourier transform of $f$. In this Lebesgue integral, $\xi$ is a point on the unit sphere and $d\sigma(\xi)$ is the Lebesgue measure on the sphere, or in other words the Lebesgue analog of $dx$.

The Fourier extension operator is the (formal) adjoint of the Fourier restriction operator $g \mapsto \widehat{f} \vline_{S^{n-1}}$, where the $\vline_X$ notation represents restriction to the set $X$.

== See also ==
- Fourier transform § Restriction problems
- Mizohata–Takeuchi conjecture
