= Dini continuity =

Special form of continuity

In mathematical analysis, Dini continuity is a refinement of continuity. Every Dini continuous function is continuous. Every Lipschitz continuous function and every Hölder continuous function is Dini continuous.

== Definition ==
Let $X$ be a compact subset of a metric space (such as $\mathbb{R}^n$), and let $f:X\rightarrow X$ be a function from $X$ into itself. The modulus of continuity of $f$ is

$$\omega_f(t) = \sup_{d(x,y)\le t} d(f(x),f(y)).$$

The function $f$ is called Dini-continuous if

$$\int_0^1 \frac{\omega_f(t)}{t}\,dt < \infty.$$

An equivalent condition is that, for any $\theta \in (0,1)$,

$$\sum_{i=1}^\infty \omega_f(\theta^i a) < \infty$$

where $a$ is the diameter of $X$.

== See also ==
- Dini test — a condition similar to local Dini continuity implies convergence of a Fourier transform.
- Kellogg's theorem
