= Dini–Lipschitz criterion =

In mathematics, the Dini–Lipschitz criterion is a sufficient condition for the Fourier series of a periodic function to converge uniformly at all real numbers. It was introduced by Ulisse Dini (1872), as a strengthening of a weaker criterion introduced by Rudolf Lipschitz (1864). The criterion states that the Fourier series of a periodic function f converges uniformly on the real line if

$$\lim_{\delta\rightarrow0^+}\omega(\delta,f)\log(\delta)=0$$

where $\omega$ is the modulus of continuity of f with respect to $\delta$.
