= Ulisse Dini =

Italian mathematician and politician (1845–1918)

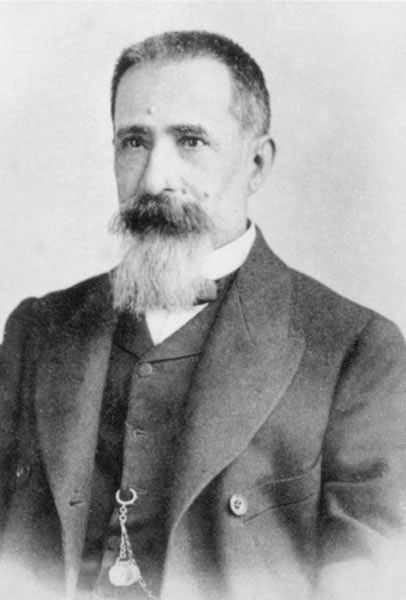
- Born: 14 November 1845; Pisa, Grand Duchy of Tuscany
- Died: 28 October 1918 (aged 72); Pisa, Italy
- Education: Scuola Normale Superiore
- Known for: Dini criterion; Implicit function theorem generalization
- Scientific career
- Fields: Mathematical analysis
- Doctoral advisor: Enrico Betti

President of the Accademia nazionale delle scienze
- In office 12 May 1910 – 30 June 1918
- Preceded by: Stanislao Cannizzaro
- Succeeded by: Vito Volterra

Ulisse Dini (14 November 1845 – 28 October 1918) was an Italian mathematician and politician, born in Pisa. He is known for his contributions to real analysis, partly collected in his book "Fondamenti per la teorica delle funzioni di variabili reali".

== Life and academic career ==
Dini attended the Scuola Normale Superiore in order to become a teacher. One of his professors was Enrico Betti. In 1865, a scholarship enabled him to visit Paris, where he studied under Charles Hermite as well as Joseph Bertrand, and published several papers. In 1866, he was appointed to the University of Pisa, where he taught algebra and geodesy. In 1871, he succeeded Betti as professor for analysis and geometry. From 1888 until 1890, Dini was rettore of the Pisa University, and of the Scuola Normale Superiore from 1908 until his death in 1918.

He was also active as a politician: in 1871 he was voted into the Pisa city council and in 1880 became a member of the Italian parliament.

=== Honors ===
He has been elected honorary member of London Mathematical Society.

== Work ==
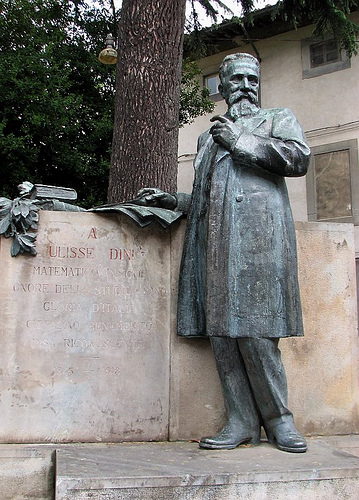
Monument to Ulisse Dini in Pisa

=== Research activity ===
Thus, by the year 1877, or seven years from the time he began, he published the treatise, since famous, entitled Foundations for the Theory of Functions of Real Variables (Fondamenti per la teoria delle funzioni di variabili reali). Much of what Dini here sets forth concerning such topics as continuous and discontinuous functions, the derivative and the conditions for its existence, series, definite integrals, the properties of the incremental ratio, etc., was entirely original with himself and has since come to be regarded everywhere as basal in the real variable theory.

— Walter Burton Ford, (Ford 1920, p. 174).

Nell'analisi del XX secolo ha avuto innanzitutto ampio sviluppo la teoria delle funzioni di variabili reali (inaugurata nel 1878 da un libro del Dini) in relazione alle operazioni classiche del calcolo.

— Francesco Severi, (Severi 1957, p. 23).

Dini worked in the field of mathematical analysis during a time when it was begun to be based on rigorous foundations. In addition to his books, he wrote about sixty papers.

He proved the Dini criterion for the convergence of Fourier series and investigated the potential theory and differential geometry of surfaces, based on work by Eugenio Beltrami.

His work on the theory of real functions was also important in the development of the concept of the measure on a set.

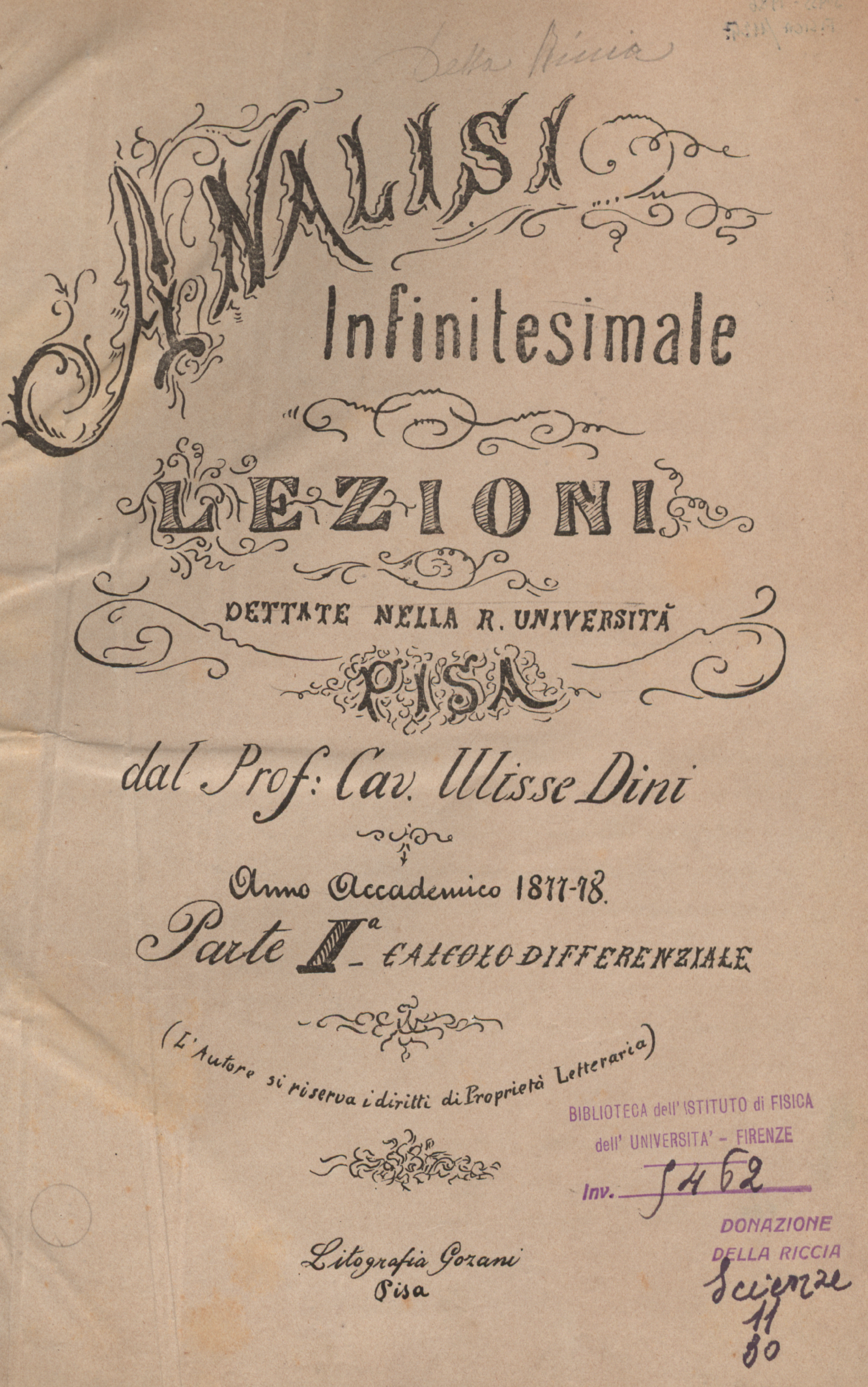
Lezioni di analisi infinitesimale, 1878

The implicit function theorem is known in Italy as Dini's theorem, not to be confused with Dini's theorem.

=== Teaching activity ===
One of his students was Luigi Bianchi.

== Books by U. Dini ==
- Serie di Fourier e altre rappresentazioni analitiche delle funzioni di una variabile reale (Pisa, T. Nistri, 1880)
- Lezioni di analisi infinitesimale. vol. 1 (Pisa, T. Nistri, 1907–1915)
- Lezioni di analisi infinitesimale.vol. 2 part 1 (Pisa, T. Nistri, 1907–1915)
- Lezioni di analisi infinitesimale.vol. 2 part 2 (Pisa, T. Nistri, 1907–1915)
- Fondamenti per la teorica delle funzioni di variabili reali (Pisa, T. Nistri, 1878)

== See also ==
- Dini continuity
- Dini criterion
- Dini derivative
- Dini series
- Dini test
- Dini's theorem
- Dini's surface
- Dini–Lipschitz criterion
