= DinI-like protein family =

DinI-like family
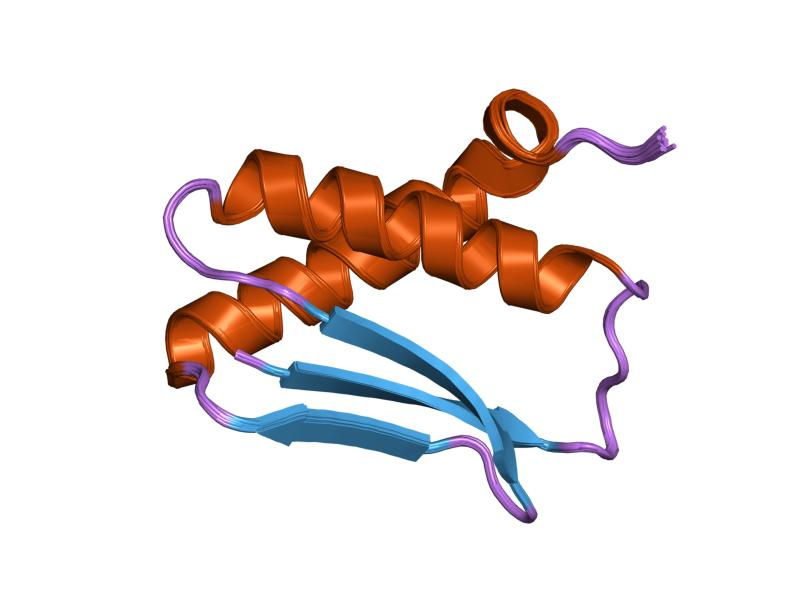
- solution structure of dini

Identifiers
- Symbol: DinI
- Pfam: PF06183
- InterPro: IPR010391
- SCOP2: 1ghh / SCOPe / SUPFAM
Available protein structures:
- PDB: IPR010391 PF06183 (ECOD; PDBsum)
- AlphaFold: IPR010391; PF06183

In molecular biology, the DinI-like protein family is a family of short proteins. The family includes DNA-damage-inducible protein I (DinI) and related proteins. The SOS response, a set of cellular phenomena exhibited by eubacteria, is initiated by various causes that include DNA damage-induced replication arrest, and is positively regulated by the co-protease activity of RecA. Escherichia coli DinI, a LexA-regulated SOS gene product, shuts off the initiation of the SOS response when overexpressed in vivo. Biochemical and genetic studies indicated that DinI physically interacts with RecA to inhibit its co-protease activity. The structure of DinI is known.
