= Dinis (surname) =

Dinis is a Portuguese surname. Notable people with the surname include:

- Alfredo Dinis (1917–1945), Portuguese anti-fascist
- Edmund Dinis (1924–2010), American politician
- Fernando Dinis (born 1982), Portuguese footballer
- Henrique Dinis (born 1990), Portuguese footballer
- João Manuel Dinis (born 1979), Portuguese footballer
- Joaquim Dinis (born 1947), Portuguese footballer
- Júlio Dinis (1839–1871), Portuguese doctor
