= Zeyn ol Dini =

Zeyn ol Dini زين الديني
- Village
- Location within Iran
- Coordinates: 27°08′22″N 53°52′10″E
- Country: Iran
- Province: Fars
- County: Lamerd
- Bakhsh: Eshkanan
- Rural District: Kal

Population (2006)
  - Total: 227
- Time zone: UTC+3:30 (IRST)
  - Summer (DST): UTC+4:30 (IRDT)

Zeyn ol Dini (Persian: زين الديني, also Romanizeed as Zeyn ol Dīnī, Zeyn ed Dīnī, and Zeyn od Dīnī; also known as Zainadoni, Zandūnī, Zeinoddin, Zen Dūnī, Zeyn Denī, and Zeyn od Dīn) is a village in Kal Rural District, Eshkanan District, Lamerd County, Fars province, Iran. At the 2006 census, its population was 227, in 57 families.
