= Hiroshi Okamura =

Japanese mathematician (1905–1948)

- Born: 10 November 1905; Kyoto, Japan
- Died: 3 September 1948 (aged 42)
- Education: Kyoto University
- Known for: Okamura's uniqueness theorem
- Scientific career
- Fields: Mathematical analysis, Differential equations
- Workplaces: Kyoto University
- Notable students: Sigeru Mizohata, Masaya Yamaguti

Hiroshi Okamura (岡村 博, Okamura Hiroshi; November 10, 1905 – September 3, 1948) was a Japanese mathematician who made contributions to analysis and the theory of differential equations. He was a professor at Kyoto University.

He discovered the necessary and sufficient conditions on initial value problems of ordinary differential equations for the solution to be unique. He also refined the second mean value theorem of integration.

== Works ==
- Hiroshi Okamura (1941), "Sur l'unicité des solutions d'un système d'équations différentielles ordinaires", Mem. Coll. Sci., Kyoto Imperial Univ. (in French), 23: 225–231
- Hiroshi Okamura (1942), "Condition nécessaire et suffisante remplie par les équations différentielles ordinaires sans points de Peano", Mem. Coll. Sci., Kyoto Imperial Univ. (in French), 24: 21–28
- Hiroshi Okamura (1943), "Sur une sorte de distance relative à un système différentiel", Nippon Sugaku-Buturigakkwai Kizi Dai 3 Ki (in French), 25: 514–523
- Hiroshi Okamura (1950), "On the surface integral and Gauss-Green's theorem", Memoirs of the College of Science, University of Kyoto, A: Mathematics, 26 (9): 5–14, doi:10.1215/kjm/1250778050 (posthumous)
