= Tang-e Baha ol Dini =

Tang-e Baha ol Dini تنگ بهاالديني
- Village
- Location within Iran
- Coordinates: 27°34′10″N 54°47′16″E
- Country: Iran
- Province: Fars
- County: Larestan
- Bakhsh: Central
- Rural District: Howmeh

Population (2006)
  - Total: 28
- Time zone: UTC+3:30 (IRST)
  - Summer (DST): UTC+4:30 (IRDT)

Tang-e Baha ol Dini (Persian: تنگ بهاالديني, also Romanized as Tang-e Bahā ol Dīnī; also known as Tang-e Bahāeddīn) is a village in Howmeh Rural District, in the Central District of Larestan County, Fars province, Iran. At the 2006 census, its population was 28, in 9 families.
