= Carathéodory's existence theorem =

Statement on solutions to ordinary differential equations

In mathematics, Carathéodory's existence theorem says that an ordinary differential equation has a solution under relatively mild conditions. It is a generalization of Peano's existence theorem. Peano's theorem requires that the right-hand side of the differential equation be continuous, while Carathéodory's theorem shows existence of solutions (in a more general sense) for some discontinuous equations. The theorem is named after Constantin Carathéodory.

== Introduction ==
Consider the differential equation

$$y'(t) = f(t,y(t))$$

with initial condition

$$y(t_0) = y_0,$$

where the function ƒ is defined on a rectangular domain of the form

$$R = \{ (t,y) \in \mathbf{R}\times\mathbf{R}^n \,:\, |t-t_0| \le a, |y-y_0| \le b \}.$$

Peano's existence theorem states that if ƒ is continuous, then the differential equation has at least one solution in a neighbourhood of the initial condition.

However, it is also possible to consider differential equations with a discontinuous right-hand side, like the equation

$$y'(t) = H(t), \quad y(0) = 0,$$

where H denotes the Heaviside function defined by

$$H(t) = \begin{cases} 0, & \text{if } t \le 0; \\ 1, & \text{if } t > 0. \end{cases}$$

It makes sense to consider the ramp function

$$y(t) = \int_0^t H(s) \,\mathrm{d}s = \begin{cases} 0, & \text{if } t \le 0; \\ t, & \text{if } t > 0 \end{cases}$$

as a solution of the differential equation. Strictly speaking though, it does not satisfy the differential equation at $t=0$, because the function is not differentiable there. This suggests that the idea of a solution be extended to allow for solutions that are not everywhere differentiable, thus motivating the following definition.

A function y is called a solution in the extended sense of the differential equation $y' = f(t,y)$ with initial condition $y(t_0)=y_0$ if y is absolutely continuous, y satisfies the differential equation almost everywhere and y satisfies the initial condition. The absolute continuity of y implies that its derivative exists almost everywhere.

== Statement of the theorem ==
Consider the differential equation

$$y'(t) = f(t,y(t)), \quad y(t_0) = y_0,$$

with $f$ defined on the rectangular domain $R=\{(t,y) \, | \, |t - t_0 | \leq a, |y - y_0| \leq b\}$. If the function $f$ satisfies the following three conditions:

- $f(t,y)$ is continuous in $y$ for each fixed $t$,
- $f(t,y)$ is measurable in $t$ for each fixed $y$,
- there is a Lebesgue-integrable function $m : [t_0 - a, t_0 + a] \to [0, \infty)$ such that $|f(t,y)| \leq m(t)$ for all $(t, y) \in R$,

then the differential equation has a solution in the extended sense in a neighborhood of the initial condition.

A mapping $f \colon R \to \mathbf{R}^n$ is said to satisfy the Carathéodory conditions on $R$ if it fulfills the condition of the theorem.

== Uniqueness of a solution ==
Assume that the mapping $f$ satisfies the Carathéodory conditions on $R$ and there is a Lebesgue-integrable function $k : [t_0 - a, t_0 + a] \to [0, \infty)$, such that

$$|f(t,y_1) - f(t,y_2)| \leq k(t) |y_1 - y_2|,$$

for all $(t,y_1) \in R, (t,y_2) \in R.$ Then, there exists a unique solution $y(t) = y(t,t_0,y_0)$ to the initial value problem

$$y'(t) = f(t,y(t)), \quad y(t_0) = y_0.$$

Moreover, if the mapping $f$ is defined on the whole space $\mathbf{R} \times \mathbf{R}^n$ and if for any initial condition $(t_0,y_0) \in \mathbf{R} \times \mathbf{R}^n$, there exists a compact rectangular domain $R_{(t_0,y_0)} \subset \mathbf{R} \times \mathbf{R}^n$ such that the mapping $f$ satisfies all conditions from above on $R_{(t_0,y_0)}$. Then, the domain $E \subset \mathbf{R}^{2+n}$ of definition of the function $y(t,t_0,y_0)$ is open and $y(t,t_0,y_0)$ is continuous on $E$.

== Example ==
Consider a linear initial value problem of the form

$$y'(t) = A(t)y(t) + b(t), \quad y(t_0) = y_0.$$

Here, the components of the matrix-valued mapping $A \colon \mathbf{R} \to \mathbf{R}^{n \times n}$ and of the inhomogeneity $b \colon \mathbf{R} \to \mathbf{R}^{n}$ are assumed to be integrable on every finite interval. Then, the right hand side of the differential equation satisfies the Carathéodory conditions and there exists a unique solution to the initial value problem.

== See also ==
- Picard–Lindelöf theorem
- Cauchy–Kowalevski theorem
