= Hannah Cairo =

American mathematician

Hannah Mira Cairo
- Born: 2007 (age 18–19); Nassau, Bahamas
- Education: University of California, Berkeley
- Known for: Disproof of the Mizohata–Takeuchi conjecture
- Scientific career
- Fields: Harmonic analysis, Fourier restriction theory
- Academic advisors: Ruixiang Zhang

Hannah Mira Cairo (born 2007) is an American mathematician who gained recognition at age 17 for disproving the longstanding Mizohata–Takeuchi conjecture in harmonic analysis.

== Early life and education ==
Cairo was born in Nassau, Bahamas. She is transgender. She began studying mathematics using online lessons from Khan Academy, and finished calculus by age 11. During the COVID-19 pandemic, she began participating in the Berkeley Math Circle (BMC) remotely. After moving to the United States, she continued to attend university-level mathematics lectures at the University of California, Berkeley, including courses taught by mathematician Ruixiang Zhang.

In fall 2025, having skipped the standard bachelor's and master's degrees, began her PhD studies at the University of Maryland, focusing on Fourier restriction theory.

== Mathematical work ==
While studying under Zhang, Cairo began working on the Mizohata–Takeuchi conjecture, which had remained unresolved since the 1980s. Initially aiming to prove the conjecture, she instead constructed a counterexample that disproved it. Her work involved using fractals and other tools and originally resulted in a more complex counterexample before finding a simpler example after reformulating the problem in frequency space.

Her findings were published in the preprint titled "A Counterexample to the Mizohata–Takeuchi Conjecture" and uploaded to the arXiv preprint server on February 10, 2025. Later that year, she presented her work at the 12th International Congress on Harmonic Analysis and Partial Differential Equations in El Escorial, Spain. Media described her as one of the youngest mathematicians to resolve a major open problem.

== See also ==
- Jean Bourgain
- Elias M. Stein
- Robert Strichartz
- Alexander Volberg

== Selected publications ==
- Cairo, Hannah Mira (2025). "A Counterexample to the Mizohata–Takeuchi Conjecture". arXiv:2502.06137 [math].
