= Nur ol Dini =

Nur ol Dini نورالديني
- Village
- Location within Iran
- Coordinates: 27°31′53″N 53°12′53″E
- Country: Iran
- Province: Fars
- County: Lamerd
- Bakhsh: Alamarvdasht
- Rural District: Kheyrgu

Population (2006)
  - Total: 149
- Time zone: UTC+3:30 (IRST)
  - Summer (DST): UTC+4:30 (IRDT)

Nur ol Dini (Persian: نورالديني, also Romanized as Nūr ol Dīnī; also known as Nūr ed Dīnī) is a village in Kheyrgu Rural District, Alamarvdasht District, Lamerd County, Fars province, Iran. At the 2006 census, its population was 149, in 32 families.
