= Dinis (given name) =

Dinis is a Portuguese masculine given name, a cognate of Dennis. Notable people with the name include:

- Dinis, Prince of Portugal (1354–1397), Portuguese infante
- Dinis Dias (15th century), Portuguese explorer
- Dinis of Portugal (1261–1325), the sixth King of Portugal and the Algarve
- Dinis of Braganza, Count of Lemos (1481–1516), the younger son of Fernando II, Duke of Braganza and Isabella of Viseu
- Dinis Sengulane (21st century), Mozambican Anglican bishop
- Dinis Vital (1932–2014), Portuguese footballer
