= Antonio Dini =

New Zealand fighter pilot (1918–1940)

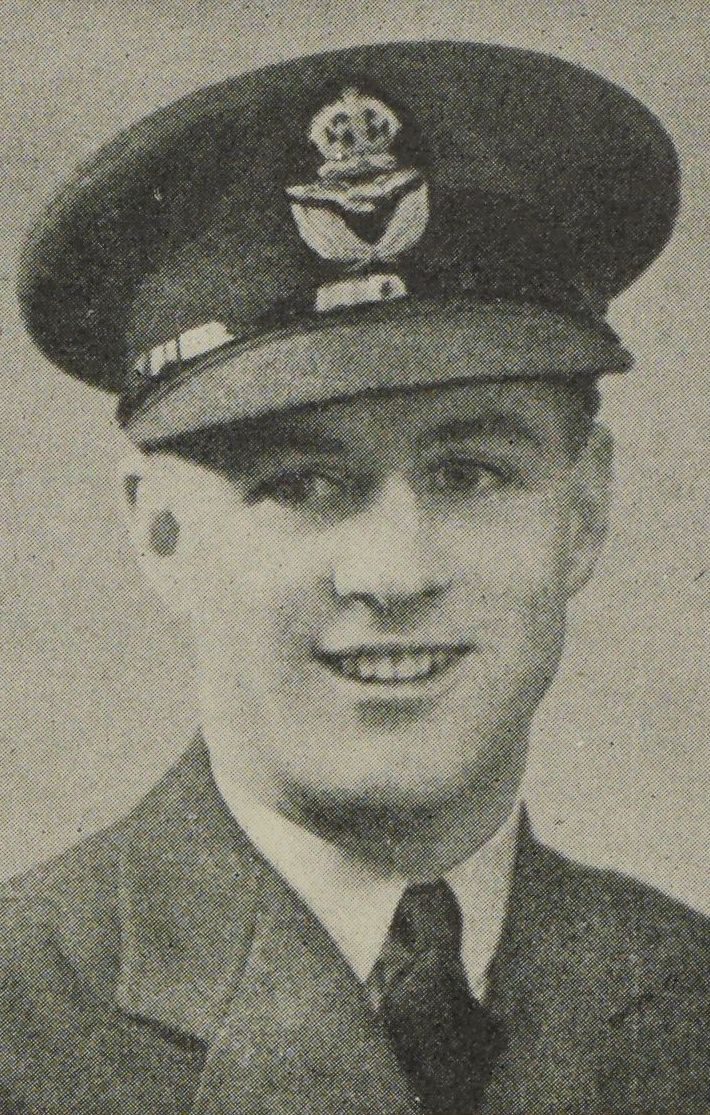
- Born: Antonio Simmons Dini; 7 January 1918; Christchurch, New Zealand
- Died: 31 May 1940 (aged 22) near Folkestone, England
- Burial place: Hawkinge Cemetery, England
- Military career
- Allegiance: New Zealand
- Branch: Royal Air Force
- Service years: 1938–1940
- Rank: Pilot officer
- Service number: 40609
- Units: 751 Naval Air Squadron; No. 66 Squadron; No. 607 Squadron; No. 605 Squadron
- Conflicts: Second World War; Battle of France

Antonio Simmons Dini (7 January 1918 – 31 May 1940) was a New Zealand fighter pilot and flying ace who flew in the Royal Air Force (RAF) during the Second World War. He is credited with at least five aerial victories.

Born in Christchurch, Dini joined the RAF in 1938. After a period of service on loan to the Fleet Air Arm and then flying with No. 66 Squadron, in early May 1940 he was posted to No. 607 Squadron. Flying a Hawker Hurricane fighter, he destroyed a number of German aircraft during the Battle of France. After returning to England later in the month, he was transferred to No. 605 Squadron. He was killed when his aircraft crashed near Folkestone shortly after taking off for the flight to join his new unit.

== Early life ==
Born on 7 January 1918 in Christchurch, Antonio Simmons Dini was one of seven children of Pietro Antonio Dini and his wife Minnie née Moorhouse. Of Corsican descent, he was educated at Christchurch Technical College after which he found employment at the Post & Telegraph Department.

== Royal Air Force ==
Dini made a successful application to join the Royal Air Force (RAF) on a short service commission with the serial number 40609, leaving for England in December 1937. Dini started flight training early the following year at the de Havilland flying school at Hatfield Aerodrome, proceeded to the RAF station at Uxbridge, and then on to No. 3 Flying Training School at South Cerney.

After gaining his wings, Dini was loaned to the Fleet Air Arm, the aviation branch of the Royal Navy, in October 1938. Assigned to the RAF's School of Naval Co-operation operating from Ford in Sussex, he flew Supermarine Walrus amphibious aircraft. His rank of pilot officer was confirmed early the following year. When the school was reorganised on 24 May 1939, Dini was posted to 751 Naval Air Squadron. Just over a week later, he was involved in a fatal incident when, as the pilot of a Walrus, he crashed the aircraft into the sea off Littlehampton. He was the only survivor of the three-man crew and, being concussed, had no recollection of the crash, with its cause being unable to be determined.

== Second World War ==
By the time of Dini's return to active duty after recovering from the injuries arising from his crash, the Second World War had broken out. On 4 September, he was posted to No. 66 Squadron, which flew Supermarine Spitfire fighters from Duxford. From here it was occasionally scrambled to intercept incoming German aircraft and also carried out patrols over the North Sea. On 1 May 1940, Dini was posted to No. 607 Squadron, which had been sent to France the previous November as part of the Air Component of the British Expeditionary Force. At the time, the squadron, equipped with Hawker Hurricane fighters, was based at Vitry-en-Artois, near Arras.

=== Battle of France ===
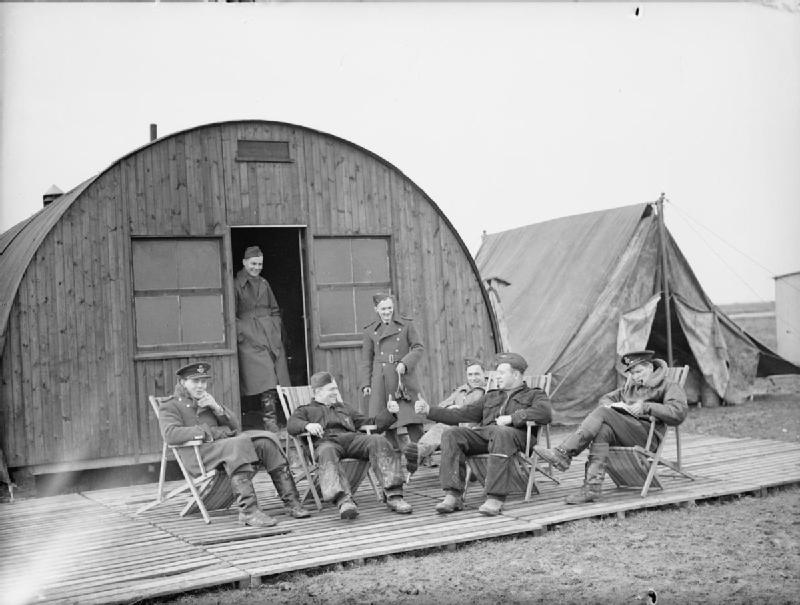
Pilots of No. 607 Squadron relaxing outside their crew dispersal area at Vitry-en-Artois

No. 607 Squadron saw little activity for much of its time in France. However, once the Battle of France commenced on 10 May, Dini was promptly in action. At around 4:15 am, he and two other pilots from his squadron engaged Heinkel He 111 medium bombers that were attacking the airfield at Vitry. He damaged one of the bombers. Dini made three more sorties that day; in the afternoon, he shared in the destruction of a He 111, had sole credit for another shot down He 111 and on his last flight of the day, damaged yet another He 111.

Dini helped shoot down another He 111 on 11 May northeast of Brussels and then two days later destroyed a Messerschmitt Bf 109 fighter close to Diest. He engaged and claimed to have shot down a Dornier Do 17 medium bomber on 16 May, although this could not be conclusively confirmed. The next day, Vitry was raided again and Dini's Hurricane was damaged during the attack, forcing his return to the airfield. Despite this, later in the day he destroyed a Do 17 bomber east of Cambrai and then shot down two He 111s near Binche, in Belgium. He may have shot down another two Do 17s the following day, but this was unable to be verified.

By 22 May, No. 607 Squadron had been withdrawn to England and was reassembling at Croydon. However, on his return to England, Dini was posted to No. 605 Squadron, another Hurricane-equipped unit and based at Hawkinge at the time but about to move to Scotland, where it was to operate from Drem. On 31 May he was killed when he crashed near Folkestone soon after taking off in his Hurricane for the flight to Scotland. He had experienced an engine failure and his aircraft rolled into a dive. He is buried at Hawkinge Cemetery in Kent.

According to aviation historians Christopher Shores and Clive Williams, Dini is credited with destroying five enemy aircraft, and shared in the destruction of two more, two damaged, and three inconclusive.
