= Dini's theorem =

Sufficient criterion for uniform convergence

In the mathematical field of analysis, Dini's theorem says that if a monotone sequence of continuous functions converges pointwise on a compact space and if the limit function is also continuous, then the convergence is uniform. The theorem is named after Ulisse Dini.

== Formal statement ==
If $X$ is a compact topological space, and $(f_n)_{n\in\mathbb{N}}$ is a monotonically increasing sequence (meaning $f_n(x)\leq f_{n+1}(x)$ for all $n\in\mathbb{N}$ and $x\in X$) of continuous real-valued functions on $X$ which converges pointwise to a continuous function $f\colon X\to \mathbb{R}$, then the convergence is uniform. The same conclusion holds if $(f_n)_{n\in\mathbb{N}}$ is monotonically decreasing instead of increasing.

This is one of the few situations in mathematics where pointwise convergence implies uniform convergence; the key is the greater control implied by the monotonicity. The limit function must be continuous, since a uniform limit of continuous functions is necessarily continuous. The continuity of the limit function cannot be inferred from the other hypothesis (consider $x^n$ in $[0,1]$.)

== Proof ==
Let $\varepsilon > 0$ be given. For each $n\in\mathbb{N}$, let $g_n=f-f_n$, and let $E_n$ be the set of those $x\in X$ such that $g_n(x)<\varepsilon$. Each $g_n$ is continuous, and so each $E_n$ is open (because each $E_n$ is the preimage of the open set $(-\infty, \varepsilon)$ under $g_n$, a continuous function). Since $(f_n)_{n\in\mathbb{N}}$ is monotonically increasing, $(g_n)_{n\in\mathbb{N}}$ is monotonically decreasing, it follows that the sequence $E_n$ is ascending (i.e. $E_n\subset E_{n+1}$ for all $n\in\mathbb{N}$). Since $(f_n)_{n\in\mathbb{N}}$ converges pointwise to $f$, it follows that the collection $(E_n)_{n\in\mathbb{N}}$ is an open cover of $X$. By compactness, there is a finite subcover, and since $E_n$ are ascending the largest of these is a cover too. Thus we obtain that there is some positive integer $N$ such that $E_N=X$. That is, if $n>N$ and $x$ is a point in $X$, then $|f(x)-f_n(x)|<\varepsilon$, as desired.
