= Hölder condition =

Type of continuity of a complex-valued function

In mathematics, we say that a function satisfies a Hölder condition, or is $\alpha$-Hölder continuous or simply Hölder continuous, if for a real or complex-valued function $f$ on $d$-dimensional Euclidean space, i.e. $f:\Omega\to\mathbb{R}$ or $\mathbb{C}$ (where $\Omega\subseteq\mathbb{R}^d$ or $\mathbb{C}^d$), when there are real constants $C\geq 0$, $\alpha> 0$, such that
$$| f(x) - f(y) | \leq C\| x - y\|^{\alpha}$$
for all $x,y\in\Omega$. More generally, the condition can be formulated for functions between any two metric spaces. The number $\alpha$ is called the exponent of the Hölder condition. A function on an interval satisfying the condition with $\alpha > 1$ is constant (see proof below). If $\alpha = 1$, then the function satisfies a Lipschitz condition. For any $\alpha > 0$, the condition implies the function is uniformly continuous. The condition is named after Otto Hölder. If $\alpha = 0$, the function is simply bounded (any two values $f$ takes are at most $C$ apart).

We have the following chain of inclusions for functions defined on a closed and bounded interval [a, b] of the real line with a < b:

Lipschitz continuous ⊂ $\alpha$-Hölder continuous ⊂ uniformly continuous ⊂ continuous,

where 0 < α ≤ 1.

== Hölder spaces ==
Hölder spaces consisting of functions satisfying a Hölder condition are basic in areas of functional analysis relevant to solving partial differential equations, and in dynamical systems. The Hölder space C^{k,α}(Ω), where Ω is an open subset of some Euclidean space and k ≥ 0 an integer, consists of those functions on Ω having continuous derivatives up through order k and such that the k-th partial derivatives are Hölder continuous with exponent α, where 0 < α ≤ 1. This is a locally convex topological vector space. If the Hölder coefficient
$$\left| f \right|_{C^{0,\alpha}} = \sup_{x,y \in \Omega,x\neq y} \frac{| f(x) - f(y) |}{\left\|x-y\right\|^\alpha},$$
is finite, then the function f is said to be (uniformly) Hölder continuous with exponent α in Ω. In this case, the Hölder coefficient serves as a seminorm. If the Hölder coefficient is merely bounded on compact subsets of Ω, then the function f is said to be locally Hölder continuous with exponent α in Ω.

If the function f and its derivatives up to order k are bounded on the closure of Ω, then the Hölder space $C^{k,\alpha}(\overline{\Omega})$ can be assigned the norm
$$\left\| f \right\|_{C^{k, \alpha}} = \left\|f\right\|_{C^k} + \max_{| \beta | = k} \left| D^\beta f \right|_{C^{0,\alpha}}$$
where β ranges over multi-indices and
$$\|f\|_{C^k} = \max_{| \beta | \leq k} \sup_{x\in\Omega} \left |D^\beta f (x) \right |.$$

These seminorms and norms are often denoted simply $\left| f \right|_{0,\alpha}$ and $\left\| f \right\|_{k,\alpha}$ or also $\left| f \right|_{0, \alpha,\Omega}\;$ and $\left\| f \right\|_{k, \alpha,\Omega}$ in order to stress the dependence on the domain of f. If Ω is open and bounded, then $C^{k,\alpha}(\overline{\Omega})$ is a Banach space with respect to the norm $\|\cdot\|_{C^{k, \alpha}}$.

== Compact embedding of Hölder spaces ==
Let Ω be a bounded subset of some Euclidean space (or more generally, any totally bounded metric space) and let 0 < α < β ≤ 1 two Hölder exponents. Then, there is an obvious inclusion map of the corresponding Hölder spaces:
$$C^{0,\beta}(\Omega)\to C^{0,\alpha}(\Omega),$$
which is continuous since, by definition of the Hölder norms, we have:
$$\forall f \in C^{0, \beta}(\Omega): \qquad | f |_{0,\alpha,\Omega}\le \mathrm{diam}(\Omega)^{\beta-\alpha} | f |_{0,\beta,\Omega}.$$

Moreover, this inclusion is compact, meaning that bounded sets in the ‖ · ‖_{0,β} norm are relatively compact in the ‖ · ‖_{0,α} norm. This is a direct consequence of the Ascoli-Arzelà theorem. Indeed, let (u_{n}) be a bounded sequence in C^{0,β}(Ω). Thanks to the Ascoli-Arzelà theorem we can assume without loss of generality that u_{n} → u uniformly, and we can also assume u = 0. Then
$$\left|u_n - u\right|_{0,\alpha} = \left| u_n \right|_{0,\alpha} \to 0,$$
because
$$\frac{|u_n(x)-u_n(y)|}{|x-y|^\alpha} = \left(\frac{|u_n(x)-u_n(y)|}{|x-y|^\beta}\right)^{\frac{\alpha}{\beta}} \left | u_n(x)-u_n(y) \right |^{1-\frac{\alpha}{\beta}} \leq |u_n|_{0,\beta}^{\frac{\alpha}{\beta}} \left(2\|u_n\|_\infty\right)^{1-\frac{\alpha}{\beta}} = o(1).$$

== Examples ==
- If 0 < α ≤ β ≤ 1 then all $C^{0,\beta}(\overline{\Omega})$ Hölder continuous functions on a bounded set Ω are also $C^{0,\alpha}(\overline{\Omega})$ Hölder continuous. This also includes β = 1 and therefore all Lipschitz continuous functions on a bounded set are also C^{0,α} Hölder continuous.
- The function f(x) = x^{β} (with β ≤ 1) defined on [0, 1] serves as a prototypical example of a function that is C^{0,α} Hölder continuous for 0 < α ≤ β, but not for α > β. Further, if we defined f analogously on $[0,\infty)$, it would be C^{0,α} Hölder continuous only for α = β.
- If a function $f$ is $\alpha$–Hölder continuous on an interval and $\alpha > 1,$ then $f$ is constant.
Proof

Consider the case $x < y$ where $x,y \in \mathbb{R}$. Then $\left| \frac { f(x) - f(y) }{x-y} \right| \leq C |x-y|^{\alpha - 1}$, so the difference quotient converges to zero as $|x-y| \to 0$. Hence $f'$ exists and is zero everywhere. Mean-value theorem now implies $f$ is constant. Q.E.D.

Alternate idea: Fix $x < y$ and partition $[x,y]$ into $\{x_i\}_{i=0}^n$ where $x_k = x + \frac{k}{n} (y-x)$. Then $|f(x) - f(y)| \leq |f(x_0) - f(x_1)| + |f(x_1) - f(x_2)| + \ldots + |f(x_{n-1}) - f(x_n)| \leq \sum_{i=1}^n C \left( \frac {|x-y|}n \right)^\alpha = C |x-y|^\alpha n^{1-\alpha} \to 0$ as $n\to \infty$, due to $\alpha > 1$. Thus $f(x) = f(y)$. Q.E.D.

- There are examples of uniformly continuous functions that are not α–Hölder continuous for any α. For instance, the function defined on [0, 1/2] by f(0) = 0 and by f(x) = 1/log(x) otherwise is continuous, and therefore uniformly continuous by the Heine-Cantor theorem. It does not satisfy a Hölder condition of any order, however.
- The Weierstrass function defined by:
  $$f(x) = \sum_{n=0}^{\infty} a^n\cos \left (b^n \pi x \right ),$$
  where $0<a<1, b$ is an integer, $b \geq 2$ and $ab > 1 + \tfrac{3\pi}{2},$ is α-Hölder continuous with
  $$\alpha = -\frac{\log(a)}{\log(b)}.$$
- The Cantor function is Hölder continuous for any exponent $\alpha \le \tfrac{\log 2}{\log 3},$ and for no larger one. (The number $\tfrac{\log 2}{\log 3}$ is the Hausdorff dimension of the standard Cantor set.) In the former case, the inequality of the definition holds with the constant C := 2.
- Peano curves from [0, 1] onto the square [0, 1]^{2} can be constructed to be 1/2–Hölder continuous. It can be proved that when $\alpha > \tfrac{1}{2}$ the image of a $\alpha$-Hölder continuous function from the unit interval to the square cannot fill the square.
- Sample paths of Brownian motion are almost surely everywhere locally $\alpha$-Hölder for every $\alpha < \tfrac{1}{2}$.
- Functions which are locally integrable and whose integrals satisfy an appropriate growth condition are also Hölder continuous. For example, if we let
  $$u_{x,r} = \frac{1}{|B_r|} \int_{B_r(x)} u(y) \, dy$$
  and u satisfies
  $$\int_{B_r(x)} \left |u(y) - u_{x,r} \right |^2 dy \leq C r^{n+2\alpha},$$
  then u is Hölder continuous with exponent α.
- Functions whose oscillation decay at a fixed rate with respect to distance are Hölder continuous with an exponent that is determined by the rate of decay. For instance, if
  $$w(u,x_0,r) = \sup_{B_r(x_0)} u - \inf_{B_r(x_0)} u$$
  for some function u(x) satisfies
  $$w \left (u,x_0,\tfrac{r}{2} \right ) \leq \lambda w \left (u,x_0,r \right )$$
  for a fixed λ with 0 < λ < 1 and all sufficiently small values of r, then u is Hölder continuous.
- Functions in Sobolev space can be embedded into the appropriate Hölder space via Morrey's inequality if the spatial dimension is less than the exponent of the Sobolev space. To be precise, if $n < p \leq \infty$ then there exists a constant C, depending only on p and n, such that:
  $$\forall u \in C^1 (\mathbf{R}^n) \cap L^p (\mathbf{R}^n): \qquad \|u\|_{C^{0,\gamma}(\mathbf{R}^n)}\leq C \|u\|_{W^{1,p}(\mathbf{R}^n)},$$
  where $\gamma = 1 - \tfrac{n}{p}.$ Thus if u ∈ W^{1, p}(R^{n}), then u is in fact Hölder continuous of exponent γ, after possibly being redefined on a set of measure 0.

== Properties ==
- A closed additive subgroup of an infinite dimensional Hilbert space H, connected by α–Hölder continuous arcs with α > 1/2, is a linear subspace. There are closed additive subgroups of H, not linear subspaces, connected by 1/2–Hölder continuous arcs. An example is the additive subgroup L^{2}(R, Z) of the Hilbert space L^{2}(R, R).
- Any α–Hölder continuous function f on a metric space X admits a Lipschitz approximation by means of a sequence of functions (f_{k}) such that f_{k} is k-Lipschitz and
  $$\left\|f - f_k\right\|_{\infty,X} = O \left (k^{-\frac{\alpha}{1-\alpha}} \right ).$$
  Conversely, any such sequence (f_{k}) of Lipschitz functions converges to an α–Hölder continuous uniform limit f.
- Any α–Hölder function f on a subset X of a normed space E admits a uniformly continuous extension to the whole space, which is Hölder continuous with the same constant C and the same exponent α. The largest such extension is:
  $$f^*(x) := \inf_{y\in X}\left\{ f(y)+C|x-y|^\alpha\right\}.$$
- The image of any $U \subset \mathbb{R}^n$ under an α–Hölder function has Hausdorff dimension at most $\tfrac{\dim_H(U)}{\alpha}$, where $\dim_H(U)$ is the Hausdorff dimension of $U$.
- The space $C^{0,\alpha}(\Omega), 0<\alpha\leq 1$ is not separable.
- The embedding $C^{0,\beta}(\Omega)\subset C^{0,\alpha}(\Omega), 0<\alpha<\beta\leq 1$ is not dense.
- If $f(t)$ and $g(t)$ satisfy on smooth arc L the $H(\mu)$ and $H(\nu)$ conditions respectively, then the functions $f(t) + g(t)$ and $f(t) g(t)$ satisfy the $H(\alpha)$ condition on L, where $\alpha = \min \{ \mu, \nu\}$.

== See also ==
- p-variation
