= Dini criterion =

In mathematics, Dini's criterion is a condition for the pointwise convergence of Fourier series, introduced by Ulisse Dini (1880).

== Statement ==
Dini's criterion states that if a periodic function $f$ has the property that $(f(t)+f(-t))/t$ is locally integrable near $0$, then the Fourier series of $f$ converges to $0$ at $t=0$.

Dini's criterion is in some sense as strong as possible: if $g(t)$ is a positive continuous function such that $g(t)/t$ is not locally integrable near $0$, there is a continuous function $f$ with $|f(t)|\leq g(t)$ whose Fourier series does not converge at $0$.
