= Infinite-dimensional Lebesgue measure =

Mathematical folklore

In mathematics, an infinite-dimensional Lebesgue measure is a measure defined on infinite-dimensional Hausdorff vector spaces, such as Banach spaces, which resembles the Lebesgue measure used in finite-dimensional spaces.

However, the traditional Lebesgue measure cannot be straightforwardly extended to all infinite-dimensional spaces due to a key limitation: any translation-invariant Radon measure on an infinite-dimensional vector space must be either infinite for all sets or zero for all sets. Despite this, certain forms of infinite-dimensional Lebesgue-like measures can exist in specific contexts. These include locally compact spaces like the Hilbert cube, which is compact, or scenarios where some typical properties of finite-dimensional Lebesgue measures are modified or omitted.

== Motivation ==
The Lebesgue measure $\lambda$ on the Euclidean space $\Reals^n$ is locally finite, strictly positive, and translation-invariant. That is:

- every point $x$ in $\Reals^n$ has an open neighborhood $N_x$ with finite measure: $\lambda(N_x) < + \infty;$
- every non-empty open subset $U$ of $\Reals^n$ has positive measure: $\lambda(U) > 0;$ and
- if $A$ is any Lebesgue-measurable subset of $\Reals^n,$ and $h$ is a vector in $\Reals^n,$ then all translates of $A$ have the same measure: $\lambda(A+h) = \lambda(A).$

Motivated by their geometrical significance, constructing measures satisfying the above set properties for infinite-dimensional spaces such as the $L^p$ spaces or path spaces is still an open and active area of research.

== General theorem ==
Let $X$ be an infinite-dimensional Hausdorff topological vector space over $\mathbb{R}$ (or more generally over a locally compact Hausdorff topological Field $K$). Then there exists no non-trivial left-invariant Radon measure on $X$.

The existence of a non-zero left-invariant Radon measure on a Hausdorff topological group implies that the group is locally compact. On the other hand, an infinite-dimensional Hausdorff topological vector space over a locally compact field is not locally compact.

=== Oxtoby's theorem ===
Oxtoby proved originally the case for non locally compact Polish groups: on a non locally compact Polish group $G$, there cannot exist a σ-finite and left-invariant Borel measure.

Oxtoby's result implies that on an infinite dimensional separable Banach space (which cannot be locally compact) a measure that perfectly matches the properties of a finite dimensional Lebesgue measure does not exist.

== Non-existence theorem in separable Banach spaces ==
Let $X$ be an infinite-dimensional, separable Banach space. Then, the only locally finite and translation invariant Borel measure $\mu$ on $X$ is a trivial measure. Equivalently, there is no locally finite, strictly positive, and translation invariant measure on $X$.

=== Proof ===
Let $X$ be an infinite-dimensional, separable Banach space equipped with a locally finite translation-invariant measure $\mu$. To prove that $\mu$ is the trivial measure, it is sufficient and necessary to show that $\mu(X) = 0.$

Like every separable metric space, $X$ is a Lindelöf space, which means that every open cover of $X$ has a countable subcover. It is, therefore, enough to show that there exists some open cover of $X$ by null sets because by choosing a countable subcover, the σ-subadditivity of $\mu$ will imply that $\mu(X) = 0.$

Using local finiteness of the measure $\mu$, suppose that for some $r > 0,$ the open ball $B(r)$ of radius $r$ has a finite $\mu$-measure. Since $X$ is infinite-dimensional, by Riesz's lemma there is an infinite sequence of pairwise disjoint open balls $B_n(r/4),$ $n \in \N$, of radius $r/4,$ with all the smaller balls $B_n(r/4)$ contained within $B(r).$ By translation invariance, all the cover's balls have the same $\mu$-measure, and since the infinite sum of these finite $\mu$-measures are finite, the cover's balls must all have $\mu$-measure zero.

Since $r$ was arbitrary, every open ball in $X$ has zero $\mu$-measure, and taking a cover of $X$ which is the set of all open balls that completes the proof that $\mu(X) = 0$.

== Nontrivial measures ==
Here are some examples of infinite-dimensional Lebesgue measures that can exist if the conditions of the above theorem are relaxed.

One example for an entirely separable Banach space is the abstract Wiener space construction, similar to a product of Gaussian measures (which are not translation invariant). Another approach is to consider a Lebesgue measure of finite-dimensional subspaces within the larger space and look at prevalent and shy sets.

The Hilbert cube carries the product Lebesgue measure and the compact topological group given by the Tychonoff product of an infinite number of copies of the circle group is infinite-dimensional and carries a Haar measure that is translation-invariant. These two spaces can be mapped onto each other in a measure-preserving way by unwrapping the circles into intervals. The infinite product of the additive real numbers has the analogous product Haar measure, which is precisely the infinite-dimensional analog of the Lebesgue measure.

== See also ==
- Cylinder set measure
- Cameron–Martin theorem – Theorem describing translation of Gaussian measures on Hilbert spaces
- Feldman–Hájek theorem – Theory in probability theory
- Gaussian measure#Infinite-dimensional spaces – Type of Borel measure
  - Structure theorem for Gaussian measures – Mathematical theorem
- Projection-valued measure – Measure used in functional analysis
- Set function – Function from sets to numbers
