= Besov measure =

Generalization of the Gaussian measure using the Besov norm

In mathematics — specifically, in the fields of probability theory and inverse problems — Besov measures and associated Besov-distributed random variables are generalisations of the notions of Gaussian measures and random variables, Laplace distributions, and other classical distributions. They are particularly useful in the study of inverse problems on function spaces for which a Gaussian Bayesian prior is an inappropriate model. The construction of a Besov measure is similar to the construction of a Besov space, hence the nomenclature.

== Definitions ==
Let $H$ be a separable Hilbert space of functions defined on a domain $D \subseteq \mathbb{R}^{d}$, and let $\{ e_{n} \mid n \in \mathbb{N} \}$ be a complete orthonormal basis for $H$. Let $s \in \mathbb{R}$ and $1 \leq p < \infty$. For $\textstyle u = \sum_{n \in \mathbb{N}} u_{n} e_{n} \in H$, define

$$\| u \|_{X^{s, p}} = \left\| \sum_{n \in \mathbb{N}} u_{n} e_{n} \right\|_{X^{s,p}} := \left( \sum_{n = 1}^{\infty} n^{( \frac{p s}{d} + \frac{p}{2} - 1)} | u_{n} |^{p} \right)^{1/p}.$$

This defines a norm on the subspace of $H$ for which it is finite, and we let $X^{s, p}$ denote the completion of this subspace with respect to this new norm. The motivation for these definitions arises from the fact that $\| u \|_{X^{s, p}}$ is equivalent to the norm of $u$ in the Besov space $B_{p p}^{s}(D)$.

Let $\kappa > 0$ be a scale parameter, similar to the precision (the reciprocal of the variance) of a Gaussian measure. We now define a $X^{s, p}$-valued random variable $u$ by

$$u := \sum_{n \in \mathbb{N}} n^{-(\frac{s}{d} + \frac{1}{2} - \frac{1}{p})} \kappa^{- \frac{1}{p}} \xi_{n} e_{n},$$

where $\xi_{1}, \xi_{2}, \dots$ are sampled independently and identically from the generalized Gaussian measure on $\mathbb{R}$ with Lebesgue probability density function proportional to $\exp ( - \tfrac{1}{2} | \xi_{n} |^{p} )$. Informally, $u$ can be said to have a probability density function proportional to $\exp (- \tfrac{\kappa}{2} \| u \|_{X^{s, p}}^{p} )$ with respect to infinite-dimensional Lebesgue measure (which does not make rigorous sense), and is therefore a natural candidate for a "typical" element of $X^{s, p}$ (although this Is not quite true — see below).

== Properties ==
It is easy to show that, when t ≤ s, the X^{t,p} norm is finite whenever the X^{s,p} norm is. Therefore, the spaces X^{s,p} and X^{t,p} are nested:

$$X^{s, p} \subseteq X^{t, p} \mbox{ when } t \leq s.$$

This is consistent with the usual nesting of smoothness classes of functions f: D → R: for example, the Sobolev space H^{2}(D) is a subspace of H^{1}(D) and in turn of the Lebesgue space L^{2}(D) = H^{0}(D); the Hölder space C^{1}(D) of continuously differentiable functions is a subspace of the space C^{0}(D) of continuous functions.

It can be shown that the series defining u converges in X^{t,p} almost surely for any t < s − d / p, and therefore gives a well-defined X^{t,p}-valued random variable. Note that X^{t,p} is a larger space than X^{s,p}, and in fact thee random variable u is almost surely not in the smaller space X^{s,p}. The space X^{s,p} is rather the Cameron-Martin space of this probability measure in the Gaussian case p = 2. The random variable u is said to be Besov distributed with parameters (κ, s, p), and the induced probability measure is called a Besov measure.

== See also ==
- Abstract Wiener space – Mathematical construction relating to infinite-dimensional spaces
- Cameron–Martin theorem – Theorem describing translation of Gaussian measures on Hilbert spaces
- Feldman–Hájek theorem – Theory in probability theory
- Structure theorem for Gaussian measures – Mathematical theorem
- There is no infinite-dimensional Lebesgue measure – Mathematical folklore
