= Ornstein–Uhlenbeck operator =

In mathematics, the Ornstein–Uhlenbeck operator is a generalization of the Laplace operator to an infinite-dimensional setting. The Ornstein–Uhlenbeck operator plays a significant role in the Malliavin calculus. The operator is named after Leonard Ornstein and George Eugene Uhlenbeck.

== Introduction: the finite-dimensional picture ==
=== Laplacian properties ===
Consider the gradient operator ∇ acting on scalar functions f : R^{n} → R; the gradient of a scalar function is a vector field v = ∇f : R^{n} → R^{n}. The divergence operator div, acting on vector fields to produce scalar fields, is the adjoint operator to ∇. The Laplace operator Δ is then the composition of the divergence and gradient operators:

$$\Delta = \mathrm{div} \circ \nabla$$,

acting on scalar functions to produce scalar functions. Note that A = −Δ is a positive operator, whereas Δ is a dissipative operator.

Using spectral theory, one can define a square root (1 − Δ)^{1/2} for the operator (1 − Δ). This square root satisfies the following relation involving the Sobolev H^{1}-norm and L^{2}-norm for suitable scalar functions f:

$$\big\| f \big\|_{H^{1}}^{2} = \big\| (1 - \Delta)^{1/2} f \big\|_{L^{2}}^{2}.$$

=== Definition of the operator ===
Often, when working on R^{n}, one works with respect to Lebesgue measure, which has many nice properties. However, remember that the aim is to work in infinite-dimensional spaces, and it is a fact that there is no infinite-dimensional Lebesgue measure. Instead, if one is studying some separable Banach space E, what does make sense is a notion of Gaussian measure; in particular, the abstract Wiener space construction makes sense.

To get some intuition about what can be expected in the infinite-dimensional setting, consider standard Gaussian measure γ^{n} on R^{n}: for Borel subsets A of R^{n},

$$\gamma^{n} (A) := \int_{A} (2 \pi)^{-n/2} \exp ( - | x |^{2} / 2) \, \mathrm{d} x.$$

This makes (R^{n}, B(R^{n}), γ^{n}) into a probability space; E will denote expectation with respect to γ^{n}.

The gradient operator ∇ acts on a (differentiable) function φ : R^{n} → R to give a vector field ∇φ : R^{n} → R^{n}.

The divergence operator δ (to be more precise, δ_{n}, since it depends on the dimension) is now defined to be the adjoint of ∇ in the Hilbert space sense, in the Hilbert space L^{2}(R^{n}, B(R^{n}), γ^{n}; R). In other words, δ acts on a vector field v : R^{n} → R^{n} to give a scalar function δv : R^{n} → R, and satisfies the formula

$$\mathbb{E} \big[ \nabla f \cdot v \big] = \mathbb{E} \big[ f \delta v \big].$$

On the left, the product is the pointwise Euclidean dot product of two vector fields; on the right, it is just the pointwise multiplication of two functions. Using integration by parts, one can check that δ acts on a vector field v with components v^{i}, i = 1, ..., n, as follows:

$$\delta v (x) = \sum_{i = 1}^{n} \left( x_{i} v^{i} (x) - \frac{\partial v^{i}}{\partial x_{i}} (x) \right).$$

The change of notation from "div" to "δ" is for two reasons: first, δ is the notation used in infinite dimensions (the Malliavin calculus); secondly, δ is really the negative of the usual divergence.

The (finite-dimensional) Ornstein–Uhlenbeck operator L (or, to be more precise, L_{m}) is defined by

$$L := - \delta \circ \nabla,$$

with the useful formula that for any f and g smooth enough for all the terms to make sense,

$$\delta ( f \nabla g) = - \nabla f \cdot \nabla g - f L g.$$

The Ornstein–Uhlenbeck operator L is related to the usual Laplacian Δ by

$$L f (x) = \Delta f (x) - x \cdot \nabla f (x).$$

== For separable Banach spaces ==
Consider now an abstract Wiener space E with Cameron-Martin Hilbert space H and Wiener measure γ. Let D denote the Malliavin derivative. The Malliavin derivative D is an unbounded operator from L^{2}(E, γ; R) into L^{2}(E, γ; H) – in some sense, it measures "how random" a function on E is. The domain of D is not the whole of L^{2}(E, γ; R), but is a dense linear subspace, the Watanabe-Sobolev space, often denoted by $\mathbb{D}^{1,2}$ (once differentiable in the sense of Malliavin, with derivative in L^{2}).

Again, δ is defined to be the adjoint of the gradient operator (in this case, the Malliavin derivative is playing the role of the gradient operator). The operator δ is also known the Skorokhod integral, which is an anticipating stochastic integral; it is this set-up that gives rise to the slogan "stochastic integrals are divergences". δ satisfies the identity

$$\mathbb{E} \big[ \langle \mathrm{D} F, v \rangle_{H} \big] = \mathbb{E} \big[ F \delta v \big]$$

for all F in $\mathbb{D}^{1,2}$ and v in the domain of δ.

Then the Ornstein–Uhlenbeck operator for E is the operator L defined by

$$L := - \delta \circ \mathrm{D}.$$
