= Trivial measure =

Measure which assigns zero to every measurable set

In mathematics, specifically in measure theory, the trivial measure on any measurable space (X, Σ) is the measure μ which assigns zero measure to every measurable set: μ(A) = 0 for all A in Σ.

== Properties of the trivial measure ==
Let μ denote the trivial measure on some measurable space (X, Σ).

- A measure ν is the trivial measure μ if and only if ν(X) = 0.
- μ is an invariant measure (and hence a quasi-invariant measure) for any measurable function f : X → X.

Suppose that X is a topological space and that Σ is the Borel σ-algebra on X.

- μ trivially satisfies the condition to be a regular measure.
- μ is never a strictly positive measure, regardless of (X, Σ), since every measurable set has zero measure.
- Since μ(X) = 0, μ is always a finite measure, and hence a locally finite measure.
- If X is a Hausdorff topological space with its Borel σ-algebra, then μ trivially satisfies the condition to be a tight measure. Hence, μ is also a Radon measure. In fact, it is the vertex of the pointed cone of all non-negative Radon measures on X.
- If X is an infinite-dimensional Banach space with its Borel σ-algebra, then μ is the only measure on (X, Σ) that is locally finite and invariant under all translations of X. See the article There is no infinite-dimensional Lebesgue measure.
- If X is n-dimensional Euclidean space R^{n} with its usual σ-algebra and n-dimensional Lebesgue measure λ^{n}, μ is a singular measure with respect to λ^{n}: simply decompose R^{n} as A = R^{n} \ {0} and B = {0} and observe that μ(A) = λ^{n}(B) = 0.
