= Sazonov's theorem =

In mathematics, Sazonov's theorem, named after Vyacheslav Sazonov, is a theorem in functional analysis which states that if a bounded linear operator between two Hilbert spaces is a Hilbert–Schmidt operator, then it is γ-radonifying. The result is important in the study of stochastic processes and the Malliavin calculus, since results concerning probability measures on infinite-dimensional spaces are of central importance in these fields. The converse of Sazonov's theorem is also true.

== Statement of the theorem ==
Let G and H be two Hilbert spaces and let T : G → H be a bounded operator from G to H. Recall that T is said to be γ-radonifying if the pushforward of the canonical Gaussian cylinder set measure on G is a bona fide measure on H. Recall also that T is said to be a Hilbert–Schmidt operator if there is an orthonormal basis { e_{i} : i ∈ I } of G such that

$$\sum_{i \in I} \| T(e_i) \|_H^2 < \infty.$$

Then Sazonov's theorem is that T is γ-radonifying if it is a Hilbert–Schmidt operator. The proof uses Prokhorov's theorem.

=== Remarks ===
The canonical Gaussian cylinder set measure on an infinite-dimensional Hilbert space can never be a bona fide measure; equivalently, the identity function on such a space cannot be γ-radonifying.

== See also ==
- Cameron–Martin theorem – Theorem describing translation of Gaussian measures on Hilbert spaces
- Girsanov theorem – Theorem on changes in stochastic processes
- Radonifying function
- Minlos–Sazonov theorem
