= Classical Wiener space =

Space of stochastic processes

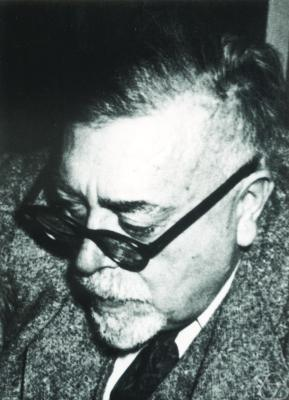
Norbert Wiener

In mathematics, classical Wiener space is the collection of all continuous functions on a given domain (usually a subinterval of the real line), taking values in a metric space (usually n-dimensional Euclidean space). Classical Wiener space is useful in the study of stochastic processes whose sample paths are continuous functions. It is named after the American mathematician Norbert Wiener.

== Definition ==
Consider $E\subseteq \mathbb{R}^n$ and a metric space $(M,d)$. The classical Wiener space $C(E,M)$ is the space of all continuous functions $f:E\to M.$ That is, for every fixed $t\in E,$

$d(f(s), f(t)) \to 0$ as $| s - t | \to 0.$

In almost all applications, one takes $E=[0,T]$ or $E=\R_+=[0, +\infty)$ and $M=\mathbb{R}^n$ for some $n\in\mathbb{N}.$ For brevity, write $C$ for $C([0,T]);$ this is a vector space. Write $C_0$ for the linear subspace consisting only of those functions that take the value zero at the infimum of the set $E.$ Many authors refer to $C_0$ as "classical Wiener space".

== Properties of classical Wiener space ==
=== Uniform topology ===
The vector space $C$ can be equipped with the uniform norm

$$\| f \| := \sup_{t \in [0,\,T]} |f(t)|$$

turning it into a normed vector space (in fact a Banach space since $[0,T]$ is compact). This norm induces a metric on $C$ in the usual way: $d (f, g) := \| f-g \|$. The topology generated by the open sets in this metric is the topology of uniform convergence on $[0,T],$ or the uniform topology.

Thinking of the domain $[0,T]$ as "time" and the range $\R^n$ as "space", an intuitive view of the uniform topology is that two functions are "close" if we can "wiggle space slightly" and get the graph of $f$ to lie on top of the graph of $g$, while leaving time fixed. Contrast this with the Skorokhod topology, which allows us to "wiggle" both space and time.

If one looks at the more general domain $\R_{+}$ with

$$\| f \| := \sup_{t \geq 0} |f(t)|,$$

then the Wiener space is no longer a Banach space, however it can be made into one if the Wiener space is defined under the additional constraint

$$\lim\limits_{s\to\infty}s^{-1}|f(s)|=0.$$

=== Separability and completeness ===
With respect to the uniform metric, $C$ is both a separable and a complete space:

- Separability is a consequence of the Stone–Weierstrass theorem;
- Completeness is a consequence of the fact that the uniform limit of a sequence of continuous functions is itself continuous.

Since it is both separable and complete, $C$ is a Polish space.

=== Tightness in classical Wiener space ===
Recall that the modulus of continuity for a function $f:[0,T]\to\R^n$ is defined by

$$\omega_{f} (\delta) := \sup \left\{ |f(s) - f(t)| : s, t \in [0, T],\, |s - t| \leq \delta \right\}.$$

This definition makes sense even if $f$ is not continuous, and it can be shown that $f$ is continuous if and only if its modulus of continuity tends to zero as $\delta\to 0:$

$$f \in C \iff \omega_{f} (\delta) \to 0 \text{ as } \delta \to 0$$.

By an application of the Arzelà-Ascoli theorem, one can show that a sequence $(\mu_{n})_{n = 1}^{\infty}$ of probability measures on classical Wiener space $C$ is tight if and only if both the following conditions are met:

$\lim_{a \to \infty} \limsup_{n \to \infty} \mu_{n} \{ f \in C : | f(0) | \geq a \} = 0,$ and
$\lim_{\delta \to 0} \limsup_{n \to \infty} \mu_{n} \{ f \in C : \omega_{f} (\delta) \geq \varepsilon \} = 0$ for all $\varepsilon >0.$

=== Classical Wiener measure ===
There is a "standard" measure on $C_0,$ known as classical Wiener measure (or simply Wiener measure). Wiener measure has (at least) two equivalent characterizations:

If one defines Brownian motion to be a Markov stochastic process $B:[0,T]\times\Omega\to\R^n,$ starting at the origin, with almost surely continuous paths and independent increments

$$B_{t} - B_{s} \sim\, \mathrm{Normal} \left( 0, |t - s| \right),$$

then classical Wiener measure $\gamma$ is the law of the process $B.$

Alternatively, one may use the abstract Wiener space construction, in which classical Wiener measure $\gamma$ is the radonification of the canonical Gaussian cylinder set measure on the Cameron-Martin Hilbert space corresponding to $C_0.$

Classical Wiener measure is a Gaussian measure: in particular, it is a strictly positive probability measure.

Given classical Wiener measure $\gamma$ on $C_0,$ the product measure $\gamma^n\times\gamma$ is a probability measure on $C$, where $\gamma^n$ denotes the standard Gaussian measure on $\R^n.$

=== Coordinate maps for the Wiener measure ===
For a stochastic process $\{X_t,t\in [0,T]\}:(\Omega,\mathcal{F},P)\to (M,\mathcal{B})$ and the function space $M^E\equiv\{E\to M\}$ of all functions from $E$ to $M$, one looks at the map $\varphi:\Omega\to M^E$. One can then define the coordinate maps or canonical versions $Y_t:M^E\to M$ defined by $Y_t(\omega)=\omega(t)$. The $\{Y_t,t\in E\}$ form another process. For $M=\mathbb{R}$ and $E=\R_{+}$, the Wiener measure is then the unique measure on $C_0(\R_{+},\R)$ such that the coordinate process is a Brownian motion.

=== Subspaces of the Wiener space ===
Let $H\subset C_0([0,R])$ be a Hilbert space that is continuously embedded and let $\gamma$ be the Wiener measure then $\gamma(H)=0$. This was proven in 1973 by Smolyanov and Uglanov and in the same year independently by Guerquin. However, there exists a Hilbert space $H\subset C_0([0,R])$ with weaker topology such that $\gamma(H)=1$ which was proven in 1993 by Uglanov.

== See also ==
- Abstract Wiener space
- Gaussian probability space
- Malliavin calculus
- Malliavin derivative
- Skorokhod space, a generalization of classical Wiener space, which allows functions to be discontinuous
- Wiener process
