= Covariance operator =

Operator in probability theory

In probability theory, for a probability measure P on a Hilbert space H with inner product $\langle \cdot,\cdot\rangle$, the covariance of P is the bilinear form Cov: H × H → R given by

$$\mathrm{Cov}(x, y) = \int_{H} \langle x, z \rangle \langle y, z \rangle \, \mathrm{d} \mathbf{P} (z)$$

for all x and y in H. The covariance operator C is then defined by

$$\mathrm{Cov}(x, y) = \langle Cx, y \rangle$$

(from the Riesz representation theorem, such operator exists if Cov is bounded). Since Cov is symmetric in its arguments, the covariance operator is self-adjoint.

Even more generally, for a probability measure P on a Banach space B, the covariance of P is the bilinear form on the algebraic dual B^{#}, defined by

$$\mathrm{Cov}(x, y) = \int_{B} \langle x, z \rangle \langle y, z \rangle \, \mathrm{d} \mathbf{P} (z)$$

where $\langle x, z \rangle$ is now the value of the linear functional x on the element z.

Quite similarly, the covariance function of a function-valued random element (in special cases is called random process or random field) z is

$$\mathrm{Cov}(x, y) = \int z(x) z(y) \, \mathrm{d} \mathbf{P} (z) = E(z(x) z(y))$$

where z(x) is now the value of the function z at the point x, i.e., the value of the linear functional $u \mapsto u(x)$ evaluated at z.

== See also ==
- Abstract Wiener space – Mathematical construction relating to infinite-dimensional spaces
- Cameron–Martin theorem – Theorem describing translation of Gaussian measures on Hilbert spaces
- Feldman–Hájek theorem – Theory in probability theory
- Structure theorem for Gaussian measures – Mathematical theorem
