= Quasi-invariant measure =

Measure that changes under a transformation but keeps the same null sets

In mathematics, a quasi-invariant measure μ with respect to a transformation T, from a measure space X to itself, is a measure which, roughly speaking, is multiplied by a numerical function of T. An important class of examples occurs when X is a smooth manifold M, T is a diffeomorphism of M, and μ is any measure that locally is a measure with base the Lebesgue measure on Euclidean space. Then the effect of T on μ is locally expressible as multiplication by the Jacobian determinant of the derivative (pushforward) of T.

To express this idea more formally in measure theory terms, the idea is that the Radon–Nikodym derivative of the transformed measure μ′ with respect to μ should exist everywhere; or that the two measures should be equivalent (i.e. mutually absolutely continuous):

$$\mu' = T_{*} (\mu) \approx \mu.$$

That means, in other words, that T preserves the concept of a set of measure zero. Considering the whole equivalence class of measures ν, equivalent to μ, it is also the same to say that T preserves the class as a whole, mapping any such measure to another such. Therefore, the concept of quasi-invariant measure is the same as invariant measure class.

In general, the 'freedom' of moving within a measure class by multiplication gives rise to cocycles, when transformations are composed.

As an example, Gaussian measure on Euclidean space R^{n} is not invariant under translation (like Lebesgue measure is), but is quasi-invariant under all translations.

It can be shown that if E is a separable Banach space and μ is a locally finite Borel measure on E that is quasi-invariant under all translations by elements of E, then either dim(E) < +∞ or μ is the trivial measure μ ≡ 0.

== See also ==
- Equivalence (measure theory) – Property of two measures in measure theory
- Cameron–Martin theorem – Theorem describing translation of Gaussian measures on Hilbert spaces
- Invariant measure – Concept in mathematics
- Ergodic theory – Branch of mathematics that studies dynamical systems
