= Gaussian measure =

Type of Borel measure

In mathematics, a Gaussian measure is a Borel measure on finite-dimensional Euclidean space $\mathbb{R}^n$, closely related to the normal distribution in statistics. There is also a generalization to infinite-dimensional spaces. Gaussian measures are named after Carl Friedrich Gauss. Gaussian measures are ubiquitous in probability theory due to the central limit theorem, which states that if a random variable $X$ is obtained by summing a large number $N$ of independent random variables with variance $1$, then $X$ has variance $N$ and its law is approximately Gaussian.

== Definitions ==
Let $n \in N$ and let $B_0(\mathbb{R}^n)$ denote the completion of the Borel $\sigma$-algebra on $\mathbb{R}^n$. Let $\lambda^n : B_0(\mathbb{R}^n) \to [0, +\infty]$ denote the usual $n$-dimensional Lebesgue measure. Then the standard Gaussian measure $\gamma^n : B_0(\mathbb{R}^n) \to [0, 1]$ is defined by
$$\gamma^{n} (A) = \frac{1}{\sqrt{2 \pi}^{n}} \int_{A} \exp \left( - \frac{1}{2} \left\| x \right\|_{\mathbb{R}^{n}}^{2} \right) \, \mathrm{d} \lambda^{n} (x)$$
for any measurable set $A \in B_0(\mathbb{R}^n)$. In terms of the Radon–Nikodym derivative,
$$\frac{\mathrm{d} \gamma^{n}}{\mathrm{d} \lambda^{n}} (x) = \frac{1}{\sqrt{2 \pi}^{n}} \exp \left( - \frac{1}{2} \left\| x \right\|_{\mathbb{R}^{n}}^{2} \right).$$

More generally, the Gaussian measure with mean $\mu \in \mathbb{R}^n$ and variance $\sigma^2 > 0$ is given by
$$\gamma_{\mu, \sigma^{2}}^{n} (A) := \frac{1}{\sqrt{2 \pi \sigma^{2}}^{n}} \int_{A} \exp \left( - \frac{1}{2 \sigma^{2}} \left\| x - \mu \right\|_{\mathbb{R}^{n}}^{2} \right) \, \mathrm{d} \lambda^{n} (x).$$

Gaussian measures with mean $\mu = 0$ are known as centered Gaussian measures.

The Dirac measure $\delta_\mu$ is the weak limit of $\gamma_{\mu, \sigma^{2}}^{n}$ as $\sigma \to 0$, and is considered to be a degenerate Gaussian measure; in contrast, Gaussian measures with finite, non-zero variance are called non-degenerate Gaussian measures.

== Properties ==
The standard Gaussian measure $\gamma^n$ on $\mathbb{R}^n$

- is a Borel measure (in fact, as remarked above, it is defined on the completion of the Borel sigma algebra, which is a finer structure);
- is equivalent to Lebesgue measure: $\lambda^{n} \ll \gamma^n \ll \lambda^n$, where $\ll$ stands for absolute continuity of measures;
- is supported on all of Euclidean space: $\operatorname{supp}(\gamma^n) = \mathbb{R}^n$;
- is a probability measure $(\gamma^n(\mathbb{R}^n) = 1)$, and so it is locally finite;
- is strictly positive: every non-empty open set has positive measure;
- is inner regular: for all Borel sets $A$,
  $$\gamma^n (A) = \sup \{ \gamma^n (K) \mid K \subseteq A, K \text{ is compact} \},$$
  so Gaussian measure is a Radon measure;
- is not translation-invariant, but does satisfy the relation
  $$\frac{\mathrm{d} (T_h)_{*} (\gamma^n)}{\mathrm{d} \gamma^n} (x) = \exp \left( \langle h, x \rangle_{\R^n} - \frac{1}{2} \| h \|_{\R^n}^2 \right),$$
  where the derivative on the left-hand side is the Radon–Nikodym derivative, and $(T_h)_*(\gamma^n)$ is the push forward of standard Gaussian measure by the translation map $T_h : \mathbb{R}^n \to \mathbb{R}^n$, $T_h(x) = x + h$;
- is the probability measure associated to a normal probability distribution:
  $$Z \sim \operatorname{Normal} (\mu, \sigma^2) \implies \mathbb{P} (Z \in A) = \gamma_{\mu, \sigma^2}^n (A).$$

== Infinite-dimensional spaces ==
It can be shown that there is no analogue of Lebesgue measure on an infinite-dimensional vector space. Even so, it is possible to define Gaussian measures on infinite-dimensional spaces, the main example being the abstract Wiener space construction. A Borel measure $\gamma$ on a separable Banach space $E$ is said to be a non-degenerate (centered) Gaussian measure if, for every linear functional $L \in E^*$ except $L = 0$, the push-forward measure $L_*(\gamma)$ is a non-degenerate (centered) Gaussian measure on $\mathbb{R}$ in the sense defined above.

For example, classical Wiener measure on the space of continuous paths is a Gaussian measure.

== See also ==
- Besov measure – Generalization of the Gaussian measure using the Besov norm
- Cameron–Martin theorem – Theorem describing translation of Gaussian measures on Hilbert spaces
- Covariance operator – Operator in probability theory
- Feldman–Hájek theorem – Theory in probability theory
