= Cylinder set measure =

In mathematics, cylinder set measure (or promeasure, or premeasure, or quasi-measure, or CSM) is a kind of prototype for a measure on an infinite-dimensional vector space. An example is the Gaussian cylinder set measure on Hilbert space.

Cylinder set measures are in general not measures (and in particular need not be countably additive but only finitely additive), but can be used to define measures, such as the classical Wiener measure on the set of continuous paths starting at the origin in Euclidean space. This is done in the construction of the abstract Wiener space where one defines a cylinder set Gaussian measure on a separable Hilbert space and chooses a Banach space in such a way that the cylindrical measure becomes σ-additive on the cylindrical algebra.

The terminology is not always consistent in the literature. Some authors call cylinder set measures just cylinder measure or cylindrical measures (see e.g.), while some reserve this word only for σ-additive measures.

== Definition ==
There are two equivalent ways to define a cylinder set measure.

One way is to define it directly as a set function on the cylindrical algebra such that certain restrictions on smaller σ-algebras are σ-additive measure. This can also be expressed in terms of a finite-dimensional linear operator.

Denote by $\mathcal{Cyl}(N,M)$ the cylindrical algebra defined for two spaces with dual pairing $\langle,\rangle:=\langle,\rangle_{N,M}$, i.e. the set of all cylindrical sets

$$C_{f_1,\dots,f_m,B}=\{x\in N\colon (\langle x,f_1\rangle,\dots,\langle x,f_m\rangle)\in B\}$$

for some $f_1,\dots,f_m\in M$ and $B\in \mathcal{B}(\mathbb{R}^m)$. This is an algebra which can also be written as the union of smaller σ-algebras.

=== Definition on the cylindrical algebra ===
Let $X$ be a topological vector space over $\R$, denote its algebraic dual as $X^*$ and let $G\subseteq X^*$ be a subspace. Then the set function $\mu:\mathcal{Cyl}(X,G)\to \R_{+}$ is a cylinder set measure (or cylinderical measure) if for any finite set $F=\{f_1,\dots,f_n\}\subset G$ the restriction to

$$\mu:\sigma(\mathcal{Cyl}(X,F))\to \R_{+}$$

is a σ-additive measure. Notice that $\sigma(\mathcal{Cyl}(X,F))$ is a σ-algebra while $\mathcal{Cyl}(X,G)$ is not.

As usual if $\mu(X)=1$ we call it a cylindrical probability measure.

=== Operatic definition ===
Let $E$ be a real topological vector space. Let $\mathcal{A} (E)$ denote the collection of all surjective continuous linear maps $T : E \to F_T$ defined on $E$ whose image is some finite-dimensional real vector space $F_T$:
$$\mathcal{A} (E) := \left\{ T \in \mathrm{Lin} (E; F_{T}) : T \mbox{ surjective and } \dim_{\R} F_{T} < + \infty\right\}.$$

A cylinder set measure on $E$ is a collection of measures
$$\left\{\mu_{T} : T \in \mathcal{A} (E)\right\}.$$

where $\mu_T$ is a measure on $F_T.$ These measures are required to satisfy the following consistency condition: if $\pi_{ST} : F_S \to F_T$ is a surjective projection, then the push forward of the measure is as follows:
$$\mu_{T} = \left(\pi_{ST}\right)_{*} \left(\mu_{S}\right).$$

If $\mu(E)=1$ then it's a cylindrical probability measure. Some authors define cylindrical measures explicitly as probability measures, however they don't need to be.

== Connection to the abstract Wiener spaces ==
Let $(H,B,i)$ be an abstract Wiener space in its classical definition by Leonard Gross. This is a separable Hilbert space $H$, a separable Banach space $B$ that is the completion under a measurable norm or Gross-measurable norm $\|\cdot\|_1$ and a continuous linear embedding $i:H\to B$ with dense range. Gross then showed that this construction allows to continue a cylindrical Gaussian measure as a σ-additive measure on the Banach space. More precisely let $H'$ be the topological dual space of $H$, he showed that a cylindrical Gaussian measure on $H$ defined on the cylindrical algebra $\mathcal{Cyl}(H,H')$ will be σ-additive on the cylindrical algebra $\mathcal{Cyl}(B,B')$ of the Banach space. Hence the measure is also σ-additive on the cylindrical σ-algebra $\mathcal{E}(B,B'):=\sigma(\mathcal{Cyl}(B,B')).$ This follows from the Carathéodory's extension theorem, and is therefore also a measure in the classical sense.

== Remarks ==
The consistency condition
$$\mu_{T} = \left(\pi_{ST}\right)_{*} (\mu_{S})$$
is modelled on the way that true measures push forward (see the section cylinder set measures versus true measures). However, it is important to understand that in the case of cylinder set measures, this is a requirement that is part of the definition, not a result.

A cylinder set measure can be intuitively understood as defining a finitely additive function on the cylinder sets of the topological vector space $E.$ The cylinder sets are the pre-images in $E$ of measurable sets in $F_T$: if $\mathcal{B}_{T}$ denotes the $\sigma$-algebra on $F_T$ on which $\mu_T$ is defined, then
$$\mathrm{Cyl} (E) := \left\{T^{-1} (B) : B \in \mathcal{B}_{T}, T \in \mathcal{A} (E)\right\}.$$

In practice, one often takes $\mathcal{B}_{T}$ to be the Borel $\sigma$-algebra on $F_T.$ In this case, one can show that when $E$ is a separable Banach space, the σ-algebra generated by the cylinder sets is precisely the Borel $\sigma$-algebra of $E$:
$$\mathrm{Borel} (E) = \sigma \left(\mathrm{Cyl} (E)\right).$$

== Cylinder set measures versus true measures ==
A cylinder set measure on $E$ is not actually a true measure on $E$: it is a collection of measures defined on all finite-dimensional images of $E.$ If $E$ has a probability measure $\mu$ already defined on it, then $\mu$ gives rise to a cylinder set measure on $E$ using the push forward: set $\mu_T = T_{*}(\mu)$on $F_T.$

When there is a measure $\mu$ on $E$ such that $\mu_T = T_{*}(\mu)$ in this way, it is customary to abuse notation slightly and say that the cylinder set measure $\left\{\mu_{T} : T \in \mathcal{A} (E)\right\}$ "is" the measure $\mu.$

== Cylinder set measures on Hilbert spaces ==
When the Banach space $E$ is also a Hilbert space $H,$ there is a canonical Gaussian cylinder set measure $\gamma^H$ arising from the inner product structure on $H.$ Specifically, if $\langle \cdot, \cdot \rangle$ denotes the inner product on $H,$ let $\langle \cdot, \cdot \rangle_T$ denote the quotient inner product on $F_T.$ The measure $\gamma_T^H$ on $F_T$ is then defined to be the canonical Gaussian measure on $F_T$:
$$\gamma_{T}^{H} := i_{*} \left(\gamma^{\dim F_{T}}\right),$$
where $i : \R^{\dim(F_T)} \to F_T$ is an isometry of Hilbert spaces taking the Euclidean inner product on $\R^{\dim(F_T)}$ to the inner product $\langle \cdot, \cdot \rangle_T$ on $F_T,$ and $\gamma^n$ is the standard Gaussian measure on $\R^n.$

The canonical Gaussian cylinder set measure on an infinite-dimensional separable Hilbert space $H$ does not correspond to a true measure on $H.$ The proof is quite simple: the ball of radius $r$ (and center 0) has measure at most equal to that of the ball of radius $r$ in an $n$-dimensional Hilbert space, and this tends to 0 as $n$ tends to infinity. So the ball of radius $r$ has measure 0; as the Hilbert space is a countable union of such balls it also has measure 0, which is a contradiction. (See infinite dimensional Lebesgue measure.)

An alternative proof that the Gaussian cylinder set measure is not a measure uses the Cameron–Martin theorem and a result on the quasi-invariance of measures. If $\gamma^H = \gamma$ really were a measure, then the identity function on $H$ would radonify that measure, thus making $\operatorname{id} : H \to H$ into an abstract Wiener space. By the Cameron–Martin theorem, $\gamma$ would then be quasi-invariant under translation by any element of $H,$ which implies that either $H$ is finite-dimensional or that $\gamma$ is the zero measure. In either case, we have a contradiction.

Sazonov's theorem gives conditions under which the push forward of a canonical Gaussian cylinder set measure can be turned into a true measure.

== Nuclear spaces and cylinder set measures ==
A cylinder set measure on the dual of a nuclear Fréchet space automatically extends to a measure if its Fourier transform is continuous.

Example: Let $S$ be the space of Schwartz functions on a finite dimensional vector space; it is nuclear. It is contained in the Hilbert space $H$ of $L^2$ functions, which is in turn contained in the space of tempered distributions $S^\prime,$ the dual of the nuclear Fréchet space $S$:
$$S \subseteq H \subseteq S^\prime.$$

The Gaussian cylinder set measure on $H$ gives a cylinder set measure on the space of tempered distributions, which extends to a measure on the space of tempered distributions, $S^\prime.$

The Hilbert space $H$ has measure 0 in $S^\prime,$ by the first argument used above to show that the canonical Gaussian cylinder set measure on $H$ does not extend to a measure on $H.$

== See also ==
- Abstract Wiener space – Mathematical construction relating to infinite-dimensional spaces
- Cylindrical σ-algebra
- Radonifying function
- Structure theorem for Gaussian measures – Mathematical theorem
- Measure theory in topological vector spaces – Subject in mathematics
