= Pushforward measure =

"Pushed forward" from one measurable space to another

In measure theory, a pushforward measure (also known as push forward, push-forward or image measure) is obtained by transferring ("pushing forward") a measure from one measurable space to another using a measurable function.

== Definition ==
Given measurable spaces $(X_1,\Sigma_1)$ and $(X_2,\Sigma_2)$, a measurable function $f\colon X_1\to X_2$ and a measure $\mu\colon\Sigma_1\to[0,+\infty]$, the pushforward of $\mu$ by $f$ is defined to be the measure $f_{*}(\mu)\colon\Sigma_2\to[0,+\infty]$ given by

$f_{*} (\mu) (B) = \mu \left( f^{-1} (B) \right)$ for $B \in \Sigma_{2}.$

This definition applies mutatis mutandis for a signed or complex measure. The pushforward measure is also denoted as $\mu \circ f^{-1}$, $f_\sharp \mu$, $f \sharp \mu$, or $f \# \mu$.

== Properties ==
=== Change of variable formula ===
Theorem: A measurable function g on X_{2} is integrable with respect to the pushforward measure f_{∗}(μ) if and only if the composition $g \circ f$ is integrable with respect to the measure μ. In that case, the integrals coincide, i.e.,

$$\int_{X_2} g \, d(f_* \mu) = \int_{X_1} g \circ f \, d\mu.$$

Note that in the previous formula $X_1=f^{-1}(X_2)$.

=== Functoriality ===
Pushforwards of measures allow to induce, from a function between measurable spaces $f:X\to Y$, a function between the spaces of measures $M(X)\to M(Y)$. As with many induced mappings, this construction has the structure of a functor, on the category of measurable spaces.

For the special case of probability measures, this property amounts to functoriality of the Giry monad.

== Examples and applications ==
- If $(\Omega, \mathcal{F}, P)$ is a probability space, $(E, \mathcal{E})$ is a measurable space, and $X : \Omega \to E$ is a $(E, \mathcal{E})$-valued random variable, then the probability distribution of $X$ is the pushforward measure of $P$ by $X$ onto $(E, \mathcal{E})$.
- A natural "Lebesgue measure" on the unit circle S^{1} (here thought of as a subset of the complex plane C) may be defined using a push-forward construction and Lebesgue measure λ on the real line R. Let λ also denote the restriction of Lebesgue measure to the interval [0, 2π) and let f : [0, 2π) → S^{1} be the natural bijection defined by f(t) = exp(i t). The natural "Lebesgue measure" on S^{1} is then the push-forward measure f_{∗}(λ). The measure f_{∗}(λ) might also be called "arc length measure" or "angle measure", since the f_{∗}(λ)-measure of an arc in S^{1} is precisely its arc length (or, equivalently, the angle that it subtends at the centre of the circle.)
- The previous example extends nicely to give a natural "Lebesgue measure" on the n-dimensional torus T^{n}. The previous example is a special case, since S^{1} = T^{1}. This Lebesgue measure on T^{n} is, up to normalization, the Haar measure for the compact, connected Lie group T^{n}.
- Gaussian measures on infinite-dimensional vector spaces are defined using the push-forward and the standard Gaussian measure on the real line: a Borel measure γ on a separable Banach space X is called Gaussian if the push-forward of γ by any non-zero linear functional in the continuous dual space to X is a Gaussian measure on R.
- Consider a measurable function f : X → X and the composition of f with itself n times:

$$f^{(n)} = \underbrace{f \circ f \circ \dots \circ f}_{n \mathrm{\, times}} : X \to X.$$

This iterated function forms a dynamical system. It is often of interest in the study of such systems to find a measure μ on X that the map f leaves unchanged, a so-called invariant measure, i.e one for which f_{∗}(μ) = μ.

- One can also consider quasi-invariant measures for such a dynamical system: a measure $\mu$ on $(X,\Sigma)$ is called quasi-invariant under $f$ if the push-forward of $\mu$ by $f$ is merely equivalent to the original measure μ, not necessarily equal to it. A pair of measures $\mu, \nu$ on the same space are equivalent if and only if $\forall A\in \Sigma: \ \mu(A) = 0 \iff \nu(A) = 0$, so $\mu$ is quasi-invariant under $f$ if $\forall A \in \Sigma: \ \mu(A) = 0 \iff f_* \mu(A) = \mu\big(f^{-1}(A)\big) = 0$
- Many natural probability distributions, such as the chi distribution, can be obtained via this construction.

== A generalization ==
In general, any measurable function can be pushed forward. The push-forward then becomes a linear operator, known as the transfer operator or Frobenius–Perron operator. In finite spaces this operator typically satisfies the requirements of the Frobenius–Perron theorem, and the maximal eigenvalue of the operator corresponds to the invariant measure.

The adjoint to the push-forward is the pullback; as an operator on spaces of functions on measurable spaces, it is the composition operator or Koopman operator.

== See also ==
- Measure-preserving dynamical system
- Normalizing flow
- Optimal transport
