= Boué–Dupuis formula =

Stochastic calculus formula

In stochastic calculus, the Boué–Dupuis formula is variational representation for Wiener functionals. The representation has application in finding large deviation asymptotics.

The theorem was proven in 1998 by Michelle Boué and Paul Dupuis. In 2000 the result was generalized to infinite-dimensional Brownian motions and in 2009 extended to abstract Wiener spaces.

== Boué–Dupuis formula ==
Let $C([0,1],\mathbb{R}^d)$ be the classical Wiener space and $B$ be a $d$-dimensional standard Brownian motion. Then for all bounded and measurable functions $f:C([0,1],\mathbb{R}^d)\to\mathbb{R}$ we have the following variational representation

$$-\log \mathbb{E}\left[e^{-f(B)}\right]=\inf\limits_{V}\mathbb{E}\left[\frac{1}{2}\int_0^1\|V_t\|^2\mathrm{d}t + f\left(B+\int_0^{\cdot}V_t\mathrm{d}t\right)\right],$$

where:

- The expectation is with respect to the probability space of $B$.
- The infimum runs over all processes which are progressively measurable with respect to the augmented filtration $\mathcal{F}^B$ generated by $B$
- $\|\cdot \|$ denotes the $d$-dimensional Euclidean norm.
