= Radonifying operator =

In measure theory, a radonifying operator (ultimately named after Johann Radon) between measurable spaces is one that takes a cylinder set measure (CSM) on the first space to a true measure on the second space. It acquired its name because the pushforward measure on the second space was historically thought of as a Radon measure.

== Definition ==
Given two separable Banach spaces $E$ and $G$, a CSM $\{ \mu_{T} | T \in \mathcal{A} (E) \}$ on $E$ and a continuous linear map $\theta \in \mathrm{Lin} (E; G)$, we say that $\theta$ is radonifying if the push forward CSM (see below) $\left\{ \left. \left( \theta_{*} (\mu_{\cdot}) \right)_{S} \right| S \in \mathcal{A} (G) \right\}$ on $G$ "is" a measure, i.e. there is a measure $\nu$ on $G$ such that

$$\left( \theta_{*} (\mu_{\cdot}) \right)_{S} = S_{*} (\nu)$$

for each $S \in \mathcal{A} (G)$, where $S_{*} (\nu)$ is the usual push forward of the measure $\nu$ by the linear map $S : G \to F_{S}$.

== Push forward of a CSM ==
Because the definition of a CSM on $G$ requires that the maps in $\mathcal{A} (G)$ be surjective, the definition of the push forward for a CSM requires careful attention. The CSM

$$\left\{ \left. \left( \theta_{*} (\mu_{\cdot}) \right)_{S} \right| S \in \mathcal{A} (G) \right\}$$

is defined by

$$\left( \theta_{*} (\mu_{\cdot}) \right)_{S} = \mu_{S \circ \theta}$$

if the composition $S \circ \theta : E \to F_{S}$ is surjective. If $S \circ \theta$ is not surjective, let $\tilde{F}$ be the image of $S \circ \theta$, let $i : \tilde{F} \to F_{S}$ be the inclusion map, and define

$$\left( \theta_{*} (\mu_{\cdot}) \right)_{S} = i_{*} \left( \mu_{\Sigma} \right)$$,

where $\Sigma : E \to \tilde{F}$ (so $\Sigma \in \mathcal{A} (E)$) is such that $i \circ \Sigma = S \circ \theta$.

== See also ==
- Abstract Wiener space – Mathematical construction relating to infinite-dimensional spaces
- Classical Wiener space – Space of stochastic processes
- Sazonov's theorem
