= Gaussian probability space =

In probability theory particularly in the Malliavin calculus, a Gaussian probability space is a probability space together with a Hilbert space of mean zero, real-valued Gaussian random variables. Important examples include the classical or abstract Wiener space with some suitable collection of Gaussian random variables.

== Definition ==
A Gaussian probability space $(\Omega,\mathcal{F},P,\mathcal{H},\mathcal{F}^{\perp}_{\mathcal{H}})$ consists of

- a (complete) probability space $(\Omega,\mathcal{F},P)$,
- a closed linear subspace $\mathcal{H}\subset L^2(\Omega,\mathcal{F},P)$ called the Gaussian space such that all $X\in \mathcal{H}$ are mean zero Gaussian variables. Their σ-algebra is denoted as $\mathcal{F}_{\mathcal{H}}$.
- a σ-algebra $\mathcal{F}^{\perp}_{\mathcal{H}}$ called the transverse σ-algebra which is defined through

$\mathcal{F}=\mathcal{F}_{\mathcal{H}} \otimes \mathcal{F}^{\perp}_{\mathcal{H}}.$

=== Irreducibility ===
A Gaussian probability space is called irreducible if $\mathcal{F}=\mathcal{F}_{\mathcal{H}}$. Such spaces are denoted as $(\Omega,\mathcal{F},P,\mathcal{H})$. Non-irreducible spaces are used to work on subspaces or to extend a given probability space. Irreducible Gaussian probability spaces are classified by the dimension of the Gaussian space $\mathcal{H}$.

=== Subspaces ===
A subspace $(\Omega,\mathcal{F},P,\mathcal{H}_1,\mathcal{A}^{\perp}_{\mathcal{H}_1})$ of a Gaussian probability space $(\Omega,\mathcal{F},P,\mathcal{H},\mathcal{F}^{\perp}_{\mathcal{H}})$ consists of

- a closed subspace $\mathcal{H}_1\subset \mathcal{H}$,
- a sub σ-algebra $\mathcal{A}^{\perp}_{\mathcal{H}_1}\subset \mathcal{F}$ of transverse random variables such that $\mathcal{A}^{\perp}_{\mathcal{H}_1}$ and $\mathcal{A}_{\mathcal{H}_1}$ are independent, $\mathcal{A}=\mathcal{A}_{\mathcal{H}_1}\otimes \mathcal{A}^{\perp}_{\mathcal{H}_1}$ and $\mathcal{A}\cap\mathcal{F}^{\perp}_{\mathcal{H}}=\mathcal{A}^{\perp}_{\mathcal{H}_1}$.

Example:

Let $(\Omega,\mathcal{F},P,\mathcal{H},\mathcal{F}^{\perp}_{\mathcal{H}})$ be a Gaussian probability space with a closed subspace $\mathcal{H}_1\subset \mathcal{H}$. Let $V$ be the orthogonal complement of $\mathcal{H}_1$ in $\mathcal{H}$. Since orthogonality implies independence between $V$ and $\mathcal{H}_1$, we have that $\mathcal{A}_V$ is independent of $\mathcal{A}_{\mathcal{H}_1}$. Define $\mathcal{A}^{\perp}_{\mathcal{H}_1}$ via $\mathcal{A}^{\perp}_{\mathcal{H}_1}:=\sigma(\mathcal{A}_V,\mathcal{F}^{\perp}_{\mathcal{H}})=\mathcal{A}_V \vee \mathcal{F}^{\perp}_{\mathcal{H}}$.

=== Remark ===
For $G=L^2(\Omega,\mathcal{F}^{\perp}_{\mathcal{H}},P)$ we have $L^2(\Omega,\mathcal{F},P)=L^2((\Omega,\mathcal{F}_{\mathcal{H}},P);G)$.

=== Fundamental algebra ===
Given a Gaussian probability space $(\Omega,\mathcal{F},P,\mathcal{H},\mathcal{F}^{\perp}_{\mathcal{H}})$ one defines the algebra of cylindrical random variables

$$\mathbb{A}_{\mathcal{H}}=\{F=P(X_1,\dots,X_n):X_i\in \mathcal{H}\}$$

where $P$ is a polynomial in $\R[X_n,\dots,X_n]$ and calls $\mathbb{A}_{\mathcal{H}}$ the fundamental algebra. For any $p<\infty$ it is true that $\mathbb{A}_{\mathcal{H}}\subset L^p(\Omega,\mathcal{F},P)$.

For an irreducible Gaussian probability $(\Omega,\mathcal{F},P,\mathcal{H})$ the fundamental algebra $\mathbb{A}_{\mathcal{H}}$ is a dense set in $L^p(\Omega,\mathcal{F},P)$ for all $p\in[1,\infty[$.

=== Numerical and Segal model ===
An irreducible Gaussian probability $(\Omega,\mathcal{F},P,\mathcal{H})$ where a basis was chosen for $\mathcal{H}$ is called a numerical model. Two numerical models are isomorphic if their Gaussian spaces have the same dimension.

Given a separable Hilbert space $\mathcal{G}$, there exists always a canoncial irreducible Gaussian probability space $\operatorname{Seg}(\mathcal{G})$ called the Segal model (named after Irving Segal) with $\mathcal{G}$ as a Gaussian space. In this setting, one usually writes for an element $g\in \mathcal{G}$ the associated Gaussian random variable in the Segal model as $W(g)$. The notation is that of an isornomal Gaussian process and typically the Gaussian space is defined through one. One can then easily choose an arbitrary Hilbert space $G$ and have the Gaussian space as $\mathcal{G}=\{W(g): g\in G\}$.

== See also ==
- Malliavin calculus
- Malliavin derivative

== Literature ==
- Malliavin, Paul (1997). Stochastic analysis. Berlin, Heidelberg: Springer. doi:10.1007/978-3-642-15074-6. ISBN 3-540-57024-1.
