= Abstract Wiener space =

Mathematical construction relating to infinite-dimensional spaces

The concept of an abstract Wiener space is a mathematical construction developed by Leonard Gross to understand the structure of Gaussian measures on infinite-dimensional spaces. The construction emphasizes the fundamental role played by the Cameron–Martin space. The classical Wiener space is the prototypical example.

The structure theorem for Gaussian measures states that all Gaussian measures can be represented by the abstract Wiener space construction.

== Motivation ==
Let $H$ be a real Hilbert space, assumed to be infinite dimensional and separable. In the physics literature, one frequently encounters integrals of the form

$$\frac{1}{Z}\int_H f(v) e^{-\frac{1}{2} \Vert v\Vert^2} Dv,$$

where $Z$ is supposed to be a normalization constant and where $Dv$ is supposed to be the non-existent Lebesgue measure on $H$. Such integrals arise, notably, in the context of the Euclidean path-integral formulation of quantum field theory. At a mathematical level, such an integral cannot be interpreted as integration against a measure on the original Hilbert space $H$. On the other hand, suppose $B$ is a Banach space that contains $H$ as a dense subspace. If $B$ is "sufficiently larger" than $H$, then the above integral can be interpreted as integration against a well-defined (Gaussian) measure on $B$. In that case, the pair $(H,B)$ is referred to as an abstract Wiener space.

The prototypical example is the classical Wiener space, in which $H$ is the Hilbert space of real-valued functions $b$ on an interval $[0,T]$ having first derivative in $L^2$ and satisfying $b(0) = 0$, with the norm being given by

$$\left\Vert b\right\Vert^2 = \int_0^T b'(t)^2\,dt.$$

In that case, $B$ may be taken to be the Banach space of continuous functions on $[0,T]$ with the supremum norm. In this case, the measure on $B$ is the Wiener measure describing Brownian motion starting at the origin. The original subspace $H\subset B$ is called the Cameron–Martin space, which forms a set of measure zero with respect to the Wiener measure.

What the preceding example means is that we have a formal expression for the Wiener measure given by
$$d\mu(b)=\frac{1}{Z} \exp\left\{-\frac{1}{2}\int_0^T b'(t)^2\,dt\right\}\,Db.$$

Although this formal expression suggests that the Wiener measure should live on the space of paths for which $\int_0^T b'(t)^2\,dt < \infty$, this is not actually the case, as sample Brownian paths are known to be almost surely nowhere differentiable, though it can be generalized to random measures as tempered distributions through the characteristic function as the white noise measure.

Gross's abstract Wiener space construction abstracts the situation for the classical Wiener space and provides a necessary and sufficient (if sometimes difficult to check) condition for the Gaussian measure to exist on $B$. Although the Gaussian measure $\mu$ lives on $B$ rather than $H$, it is the geometry of $H$ rather than $B$ that controls the properties of $\mu$. As Gross himself puts it (adapted to our notation), "However, it only became apparent with the work of I.E. Segal dealing with the normal distribution on a real Hilbert space, that the role of the Hilbert space $H$ was indeed central, and that in so far as analysis on $B$ is concerned, the role of $B$ itself was auxiliary for many of Cameron and Martin's theorems, and in some instances even unnecessary." One of the appealing features of Gross's abstract Wiener space construction is that it takes $H$ as the starting point and treats $B$ as an auxiliary object.

Although the formal expressions for $\mu$ appearing earlier in this section are purely formal, physics-style expressions, they are very useful in helping to understand properties of $\mu$. Notably, one can easily use these expressions to derive the (correct!) formula for the density of the translated measure $d\mu(b+h)$ relative to $d\mu(b)$, for $h\in H$. (See the Cameron–Martin theorem.)

== Mathematical description ==
=== Cylinder set measure on H ===
Let $H$ be a Hilbert space defined over the real numbers, assumed to be infinite dimensional and separable. A cylinder set in $H$ is a set defined in terms of the values of a finite collection of linear functionals on $H$. Specifically, suppose $\phi_1,\ldots,\phi_n$ are continuous linear functionals on $H$ and $E$ is a Borel set in $\R^n$. Then we can consider the set
$$C = \left\{v\in H \mid (\phi_1(v),\ldots,\phi_n(v)) \in E \right\}.$$

Any set of this type is called a cylinder set. The collection of all cylinder sets forms an algebra of sets in $H,$ called the cylindrical algebra. Note that this algebra is not a $\sigma$-algebra.

There is a natural way of defining a "measure" on cylinder sets, as follows. By the Riesz representation theorem, the linear functionals $\phi_1, \ldots, \phi_n$ are given as the inner product with vectors $v_1, \ldots, v_n$ in $H$. In light of the Gram–Schmidt procedure, it is harmless to assume that $v_1, \ldots, v_n$ are orthonormal. In that case, we can associate to the above-defined cylinder set $C$ the measure of $E$ with respect to the standard Gaussian measure on $\mathbb R^n$. That is, we define
$$\mu(C)=(2\pi)^{-n/2}\int_{E \subset \R^n}e^{-\Vert x\Vert^2/2}\,dx,$$
where $dx$ is the standard Lebesgue measure on $\R^n$. Because of the product structure of the standard Gaussian measure on $\R^n$, it is not hard to show that $\mu$ is well defined. That is, although the same set $C$ can be represented as a cylinder set in more than one way, the value of $\mu(C)$ is always the same.

=== Nonexistence of the measure on H ===
The set functional $\mu$ is called the standard Gaussian cylinder set measure on $H$. Assuming (as we do) that $H$ is infinite dimensional, $\mu$ does not extend to a countably additive measure on the $\sigma$-algebra generated by the collection of cylinder sets in $H$ (that is, it does not extend to the cylindrical σ-algebra generated by the cylinder algebra.) One can understand the difficulty by considering the behavior of the standard Gaussian measure on $\R^n,$ given by
$$(2\pi)^{-n/2} e^{-\Vert x\Vert^2/2}\,dx.$$

The expectation value of the squared norm with respect to this measure is computed as an elementary Gaussian integral as
$$(2\pi)^{-n/2} \int_{\R^n} \Vert x\Vert^2 e^{-\Vert x\Vert^2/2} \,dx = (2\pi)^{-1/2} \sum_{i=1}^n \int_\R x_i^2 e^{-x_i^2/2} \, dx_i = n.$$

That is, the typical distance from the origin of a vector chosen randomly according to the standard Gaussian measure on $\R^n$ is $\sqrt n.$ As $n$ tends to infinity, this typical distance tends to infinity, indicating that there is no well-defined "standard Gaussian" measure on $H$. (The typical distance from the origin would be infinite, so that the measure would not actually live on the space $H$.)

=== Existence of the measure on B ===
Now suppose that $B$ is a separable Banach space and that $i:H\rightarrow B$ is an injective continuous linear map whose image is dense in $B$. It is then harmless (and convenient) to identify $H$ with its image inside $B$ and thus regard $H$ as a dense subset of $B$. We may then construct a cylinder set measure on $B$ by defining the measure of a cylinder set $C\subset B$ to be the previously defined cylinder set measure of $C\cap H$, which is a cylinder set in $H$.

The idea of the abstract Wiener space construction is that if $B$ is sufficiently bigger than $H$, then the cylinder set measure on $B$, unlike the cylinder set measure on $H$, will extend to a countably additive measure on the generated $\sigma$-algebra. The original paper of Gross gives a necessary and sufficient condition on $B$ for this to be the case. The measure on $B$ is called a Gaussian measure and the subspace $H\subset B$ is called the Cameron–Martin space. It is important to emphasize that $H$ forms a set of measure zero inside $B$, emphasizing that the Gaussian measure lives only on $B$ and not on $H$.

The upshot of this whole discussion is that Gaussian integrals of the sort described in the motivation section do have a rigorous mathematical interpretation, but they do not live on the space whose norm occurs in the exponent of the formal expression. Rather, they live on some larger space.

=== Universality of the construction ===
The abstract Wiener space construction is not simply one method of building Gaussian measures. Rather, every Gaussian measure on an infinite-dimensional Banach space occurs in this way. (See the structure theorem for Gaussian measures.) That is, given a Gaussian measure $\mu$ on an infinite-dimensional, separable Banach space (over $\mathbb R$), one can identify a Cameron–Martin subspace $H\subset B$, at which point the pair $(H,B)$ becomes an abstract Wiener space and $\mu$ is the associated Gaussian measure.

== Properties ==
- $\mu$ is a Borel measure: it is defined on the Borel σ-algebra generated by the open subsets of B.
- $\mu$ is a Gaussian measure in the sense that f_{∗}($\mu$) is a Gaussian measure on R for every linear functional f ∈ B^{∗}, f ≠ 0.
- Hence, $\mu$ is strictly positive and locally finite.
- The behaviour of $\mu$ under translation is described by the Cameron–Martin theorem.
- Given two abstract Wiener spaces i_{1} : H_{1} → B_{1} and i_{2} : H_{2} → B_{2}, one can show that $\gamma_{12}=\gamma_1\otimes\gamma_2$. In full:
  $$(i_1 \times i_2)_* (\mu^{H_1 \times H_2}) = (i_1)_* \left( \mu^{H_1} \right) \otimes (i_2)_* \left( \mu^{H_2} \right),$$
  i.e., the abstract Wiener measure $\mu_{12}$ on the Cartesian product B_{1} × B_{2} is the product of the abstract Wiener measures on the two factors B_{1} and B_{2}.
- If H (and B) are infinite dimensional, then the image of H has measure zero. This fact is a consequence of Kolmogorov's zero–one law.
- The inclusion map $i\colon H\hookrightarrow E$ is an example of a $\gamma$-radonifying map, since the pushforward measure $i_*\mu$ is a Radon measure. Gross originally formulated a necessary and sufficient condition for $\gamma$-radonification in terms of the measurable seminorms.

== Example: Classical Wiener space ==
The prototypical example of an abstract Wiener space takes the space $B$ to be classical Wiener space, the space of continuous paths. The subspace $H$ is given by

$$\begin{align}
H &:= L_{0}^{2, 1} ([0, T]; \mathbb{R}^{n}) \\
&:= \{ \text{Absolutely continuous paths starting at 0 with square-integrable first derivative}\}
\end{align}$$

with inner product given by

$$\langle \sigma_1, \sigma_2 \rangle_{L_0^{2,1}} := \int_0^T \langle \dot{\sigma}_1 (t), \dot{\sigma}_2 (t) \rangle_{\R^{n}} \, dt.$$

The classical Wiener space $B$ is then the space of continuous maps of $[0,T]$ into $\mathbb R^n$ starting at 0, with the uniform norm. In this case, the Gaussian measure $\mu$ is the Wiener measure, which describes Brownian motion in $\mathbb R^n$, starting from the origin.

The general result that $H$ forms a set of measure zero with respect to $\mu$ in this case reflects the roughness of the typical Brownian path, which is known to be nowhere differentiable. This contrasts with the assumed differentiability of the paths in $H$.

== See also ==
- Besov measure – Generalization of the Gaussian measure using the Besov norm
- Cameron–Martin theorem – Theorem describing translation of Gaussian measures on Hilbert spaces
- Boué–Dupuis formula – Stochastic calculus formula
- Feldman–Hájek theorem – Theory in probability theory
- Gaussian probability space
- Malliavin calculus – Mathematical techniques used in probability theory and related fields
- Structure theorem for Gaussian measures – Mathematical theorem
- There is no infinite-dimensional Lebesgue measure – Mathematical folklore
