= Paley–Wiener integral =

In mathematics, the Paley–Wiener integral is a simple stochastic integral. When applied to classical Wiener space, it is less general than the Itô integral, but the two agree when they are both defined.

The integral is named after its discoverers, Raymond Paley and Norbert Wiener.

== Definition ==
Let $i : H \to E$ be an abstract Wiener space with abstract Wiener measure $\gamma$ on $E$. Let $j : E^* \to H$ be the adjoint of $i$. (We have abused notation slightly: strictly speaking, $j : E^* \to H^*$, but since $H$ is a Hilbert space, it is isometrically isomorphic to its dual space $H^*$, by the Riesz representation theorem.)

It can be shown that $j$ is an injective function and has dense image in $H$. Furthermore, it can be shown that every linear functional $f \in E^*$ is also square-integrable: in fact,

$$\| f \|_{L^{2} (E, \gamma; \mathbb{R})} = \| j(f) \|_{H}$$

This defines a natural linear map from $j(E^*)$ to $L^2(E, \gamma; \mathbb{R})$, under which $j(f) \in j(E^*) \subseteq H$ goes to the equivalence class $[f]$ of $f$ in $L^2(E, \gamma; \mathbb{R})$. This is well-defined since $j$ is injective. This map is an isometry, so it is continuous.

However, since a continuous linear map between Banach spaces such as $H$ and $L^2(E, \gamma; \mathbb{R})$ is uniquely determined by its values on any dense subspace of its domain, there is a unique continuous linear extension $I : H \to L^2(E, \gamma; \mathbb{R})$ of the above natural map $j(E^*) \to L^2(E, \gamma; \mathbb{R})$ to the whole of $H$.

This isometry $I : H \to L^2(E, \gamma; \mathbb{R})$ is known as the Paley–Wiener map. $I(h)$, also denoted $\langle h, x \rangle^\sim$, is a function on $E$ and is known as the Paley–Wiener integral (with respect to $h \in H$).

The Paley–Wiener integral for a particular element $h \in H$ is a function on $E$. The notation $\langle h, x \rangle^\sim$ does not really denote an inner product (since $h$ and $x$ belong to two different spaces), but is a convenient abuse of notation in view of the Cameron–Martin theorem. For this reason, many authors prefer to write $\langle h, - \rangle^\sim (x)$ or $I(h)(x)$ rather than using the more compact but potentially confusing $\langle h, x \rangle^\sim$ notation.

== See also ==
Other stochastic integrals:

- Itô integral
- Skorokhod integral
- Stratonovich integral
