= Supporting measure =

Supporting measure may refer to

- a σ-finite equivalent measure, see Equivalence (measure theory)#Supporting measure
- a special measure in the context of random measures, see Random measure#Supporting measure
