= Ornstein–Uhlenbeck =

Ornstein–Uhlenbeck may refer to:

- Ornstein–Uhlenbeck operator
- Ornstein–Uhlenbeck process
