= Invariant measure =

Concept in mathematics

In mathematics, an invariant measure is a measure that is preserved by some function. The function may be a geometric transformation. For examples, circular angle is invariant under rotation, hyperbolic angle is invariant under squeeze mapping, and a difference of slopes is invariant under shear mapping.

Ergodic theory is the study of invariant measures in dynamical systems. The Krylov–Bogolyubov theorem proves the existence of invariant measures under certain conditions on the function and space under consideration.

== Definition ==
Let $(X, \Sigma)$ be a measurable space and let $f : X \to X$ be a measurable function from $X$ to itself. A measure $\mu$ on $(X, \Sigma)$ is said to be invariant under $f$ if, for every measurable set $A$ in $\Sigma,$ $\mu\left(f^{-1}(A)\right) = \mu(A).$

In terms of the pushforward measure, this states that $f_*(\mu) = \mu.$

The collection of measures (usually probability measures) on $X$ that are invariant under $f$ is sometimes denoted $M_f(X).$ The collection of ergodic measures, $E_f(X),$ is a subset of $M_f(X).$ Moreover, any convex combination of two invariant measures is also invariant, so $M_f(X)$ is a convex set; $E_f(X)$ consists precisely of the extreme points of $M_f(X).$

In the case of a dynamical system $(X, T, \varphi),$ where $(X, \Sigma)$ is a measurable space as before, $T$ is a monoid and $\varphi : T \times X \to X$ is the flow map, a measure $\mu$ on $(X, \Sigma)$ is said to be an invariant measure if it is an invariant measure for each map $\varphi_t : X \to X.$ Explicitly, $\mu$ is invariant if and only if $\mu\left(\varphi_{t}^{-1}(A)\right) = \mu(A) \qquad \text{ for all } t \in T, A \in \Sigma.$

Put another way, $\mu$ is an invariant measure for a sequence of random variables $\left(Z_t\right)_{t \geq 0}$ (perhaps a Markov chain or the solution to a stochastic differential equation) if, whenever the initial condition $Z_0$ is distributed according to $\mu,$ so is $Z_t$ for any later time $t.$

When the dynamical system can be described by a transfer operator, then the invariant measure is an eigenvector of the operator, corresponding to an eigenvalue of $1,$ this being the largest eigenvalue as given by the Frobenius–Perron theorem.

== Examples ==
Squeeze mapping leaves hyperbolic angle invariant as it moves a hyperbolic sector (purple) to one of the same area. Blue and green rectangles also keep the same area

- Consider the real line $\R$ with its usual Borel σ-algebra; fix $a \in \R$ and consider the translation map $T_a : \R \to \R$ given by: $T_a(x) = x + a.$ Then one-dimensional Lebesgue measure $\lambda$ is an invariant measure for $T_a.$
- More generally, on $n$-dimensional Euclidean space $\R^n$ with its usual Borel σ-algebra, $n$-dimensional Lebesgue measure $\lambda^n$ is an invariant measure for any isometry of Euclidean space, that is, a map $T : \R^n \to \R^n$ that can be written as $T(x) = A x + b$ for some $n \times n$ orthogonal matrix $A \in O(n)$ and a vector $b \in \R^n.$
- The invariant measure in the first example is unique up to trivial renormalization with a constant factor. This does not have to be necessarily the case: Consider a set consisting of just two points $\mathbf{S} = \{A,B\}$ and the identity map $T = \operatorname{Id}$ which leaves each point fixed. Then any probability measure $\mu : \mathbf{S} \to \R$ is invariant. Note that $\mathbf{S}$ trivially has a decomposition into $T$-invariant components $\{A\}$ and $\{B\}.$
- Area measure in the Euclidean plane is invariant under the special linear group $\operatorname{SL}(2, \R)$ of the $2 \times 2$ real matrices of determinant $1.$
- Every locally compact group has a Haar measure that is invariant under the group action (translation).

== See also ==
- Quasi-invariant measure
