= Vyacheslav Vasilievich Sazonov =

Soviet-Russian mathematician

Vyacheslav Vasilievich Sazonov (Вячеслав Васильевич Сазонов, born August 25, 1935, Moscow – February 3, 2002, Moscow) was a Soviet-Russian mathematician, specializing in probability and measure theory. He is known for Sazonov's theorem.

== Education and career ==
In 1958 he graduated from Moscow State University. There he received in 1961 his Ph.D. under Yuri Prokhorov with thesis "Распределения вероятностей и характеристические функционалы" (Probability distributions and characteristic functionals). Sazonov worked in the Steklov Institute of Mathematics from 1958 to 2002. In 1968 he received his Russian doctorate of sciences (Doctor Nauk) with thesis "Исследования по многомерным и бесконечномерным предельным теоремам теории вероятностей" (Investigations of multidimensional, infinite-dimensional and limit theorems of the theory of probabilities). In 1970 he was an Invited Speaker at the ICM in Nice. In 1971 he was awarded the academic title of Professor in Mathematics and became a member of the CPSU. From 1971 to 1999, he was a professor in the Department of Mathematical Statistics, Faculty of Computational Mathematics and Cybernetics, Moscow State University. Professor Sazonov has been deputy editor-in-chief of the journal Theory of Probability and Its Applications for about two decades.

== Awards ==
- USSR State Prize (1979, jointly with Aleksandr A. Borovkov and V. Statulevičius) for a series of works on asymptotic methods in the theory of probability.

== Selected publications ==
- Sazonov, V. V. (1981). Normal approximation—some recent advances. Lecture Notes in Mathematics. Vol. 879. Springer. doi:10.1007/BFb0096862.
- Prokhorov, Yuri V.; Sazonov, V. V., eds. (1987). Proceedings of the 1st World Congress of the Bernoulli Society: Tashkent, USSR, 8–14 September 1986. Vol. 1. VNU Science Press.
- Sazonov, V. V.; Zalesskii, B. A.; Ulyanov, V. V. (1989). "Normal approximation in Hilbert space". Theory of Probability and Its Applications. 33 (2): 207–227.
- Sazonov, V. V.; Zalesskii, B. A.; Ulyanov, V. V. (1989). "Normal approximation in Hilbert space". Theory of Probability and Its Applications. 33 (3): 473–487.
