= Feldman–Hájek theorem =

Theory in probability theory

In probability theory, the Feldman–Hájek theorem or Feldman–Hájek dichotomy is a fundamental result in the theory of Gaussian measures. It states that two Gaussian measures $\mu$ and $\nu$ on a locally convex space $X$ are either equivalent measures or else mutually singular: there is no possibility of an intermediate situation in which, for example, $\mu$ has a density with respect to $\nu$ but not vice versa. In the special case that $X$ is a Hilbert space, it is possible to give an explicit description of the circumstances under which $\mu$ and $\nu$ are equivalent: writing $m_{\mu}$ and $m_{\nu}$ for the means of $\mu$ and $\nu,$ and $C_\mu$ and $C_\nu$ for their covariance operators, equivalence of $\mu$ and $\nu$ holds if and only if

- $\mu$ and $\nu$ have the same Cameron–Martin space $H = C_\mu^{1/2}(X) = C_\nu^{1/2}(X)$;
- the difference in their means lies in this common Cameron–Martin space, i.e. $m_\mu - m_\nu \in H$; and
- the operator $(C_\mu^{-1/2} C_\nu^{1/2}) (C_\mu^{-1/2} C_\nu^{1/2})^{\ast} - I$ is a Hilbert–Schmidt operator on $\bar{H}.$

A simple consequence of the Feldman–Hájek theorem is that dilating a Gaussian measure on an infinite-dimensional Hilbert space $X$ (i.e. taking $C_\nu = s C_\mu$ for some scale factor $s \geq 0$) always yields two mutually singular Gaussian measures, except for the trivial dilation with $s = 1,$ since $(s^2 - 1) I$ is Hilbert–Schmidt only when $s = 1.$

== See also ==
- Canonical Gaussian cylinder set measure – way to generate a measure over product spaces
