= Structure theorem for Gaussian measures =

Mathematical theorem

In mathematics, the structure theorem for Gaussian measures shows that the abstract Wiener space construction is essentially the only way to obtain a strictly positive Gaussian measure on a separable Banach space. It was proved in the 1970s by Kallianpur–Satô–Stefan and Dudley–Feldman–le Cam.

An earlier result due to Hiroshi Satô proves that "any Gaussian measure on a separable Banach space is an abstract Wiener measure in the sense of L. Gross". The result by Dudley, Feldman and Le Cam generalizes this result to the setting of Gaussian measures on a general topological vector space.

== Statement of the theorem ==
Let γ be a strictly positive Gaussian measure on a separable Banach space (E, || ||). Then there exists a separable Hilbert space (H, ⟨ , ⟩) and a map i : H → E such that i : H → E is an abstract Wiener space with γ = i_{∗}(γ^{H}), where γ^{H} is the canonical Gaussian cylinder set measure on H.
