= Cameron–Martin theorem =

Theorem describing translation of Gaussian measures on Hilbert spaces

In mathematics, the Cameron–Martin theorem or Cameron–Martin formula (named after Robert Horton Cameron and W. T. Martin) is a theorem of measure theory that describes how abstract Wiener measure changes under translation by certain elements of the Cameron–Martin Hilbert space.

== Motivation ==
The standard Gaussian measure $\gamma^n$ on $n$-dimensional Euclidean space $\mathbf{R}^n$ is not translation-invariant. (In fact, there is a unique translation invariant Radon measure up to scale by Haar's theorem: the $n$-dimensional Lebesgue measure, denoted here $dx$.) Instead, a measurable subset $A$ has Gaussian measure

$$\gamma_n(A) = \frac{1}{(2\pi)^{n/2}}\int_A \exp\left(-\tfrac12\langle x, x\rangle_{\mathbf R^n}\right)\,dx.$$

Here $\langle x,x\rangle_{\mathbf R^n}$ refers to the standard Euclidean dot product in $\mathbf{R}^n$. The Gaussian measure of the translation of $A$ by a vector $h \in \mathbf{R}^n$ is

$$\begin{align}
\gamma_n(A-h) &= \frac{1}{(2\pi)^{n/2}}\int_A \exp\left(-\tfrac12\langle x-h, x-h\rangle_{\mathbf R^n}\right)\,dx\\[4pt]
&=\frac{1}{(2\pi)^{n/2}}\int_A \exp\left(\frac{2\langle x, h\rangle_{\mathbf R^n} - \langle h, h\rangle_{\mathbf R^n}}{2}\right)\exp\left(-\tfrac12\langle x, x\rangle_{\mathbf R^n}\right)\,dx.
\end{align}$$

So under translation through $h$, the Gaussian measure scales by the distribution function appearing in the last display:

$$\exp\left(\frac{2\langle x, h\rangle_{\mathbf R^n} - \langle h, h\rangle_{\mathbf R^n}}{2} \right)=\exp\left(\langle x, h\rangle_{\mathbf R^n} - \tfrac12\|h\|_{\mathbf R^n}^ 2\right).$$

The measure that associates to the set $A$ the number $\gamma_n(A - h)$ is the pushforward measure, denoted $(T_h)_* (\gamma^n).$ Here $T_h : \mathbf{R}^n \to \mathbf{R}^n$ refers to the translation map: $T_h(x) = x + h$. The above calculation shows that the Radon–Nikodym derivative of the pushforward measure with respect to the original Gaussian measure is given by

$$\frac{\mathrm{d} (T_h)_{*} (\gamma^n)}{\mathrm{d} \gamma^n} (x) = \exp \left( \left \langle h, x \right \rangle_{\mathbf{R}^n} - \tfrac{1}{2} \| h \|_{\mathbf{R}^n}^2 \right).$$

The abstract Wiener measure $\gamma$ on a separable Banach space $E$, where $i : H \to E$ is an abstract Wiener space, is also a "Gaussian measure" in a suitable sense. How does it change under translation? It turns out that a similar formula to the one above holds if we consider only translations by elements of the dense subspace $i(H) \subseteq E$.

== Statement of the theorem ==
=== For abstract Wiener spaces (Banach space setting) ===
Let $i : H \to E$ be an abstract Wiener space with abstract Wiener measure $\gamma : \operatorname{Borel}(E) \to [0, 1]$. For $h \in H$, define $T_h : E \to E$ by $T_h(x) = x + i(h)$. Then $(T_h)_*(\gamma)$ is equivalent to $\gamma$ with Radon–Nikodym derivative

$$\frac{\mathrm{d} (T_{h})_{*} (\gamma)}{\mathrm{d} \gamma} (x) = \exp \left( \langle h, x \rangle^{\sim} - \tfrac{1}{2} \| h \|_{H}^{2} \right),$$

where

$$\langle h, x \rangle^{\sim} = i(h) (x)$$

denotes the Paley–Wiener integral.

The Cameron–Martin formula is valid only for translations by elements of the dense subspace $i(H) \subseteq E$, called Cameron–Martin space, and not by arbitrary elements of $E$. If the Cameron–Martin formula did hold for arbitrary translations, it would contradict the following result:

If $E$ is a separable Banach space and $\mu$ is a locally finite Borel measure on $E$ that is equivalent to its own push forward under any translation, then either $E$ has finite dimension or $\mu$ is the trivial (zero) measure. (See quasi-invariant measure.)

In fact, $\gamma$ is quasi-invariant under translation by an element $v$ if and only if $v \in i(H)$. Vectors in $i(H)$ are sometimes known as Cameron–Martin directions.

=== General version for locally convex vector spaces ===
Consider a locally convex vector space $E$, with a Gaussian measure $\gamma$ on the cylindrical σ-algebra $\sigma(\operatorname{Cyl}(E,E'))$ and let $\gamma_{m}:=\gamma(\cdot - m)$ denote the translation by $m\in E$. For an element in the topological dual $f\in E'$ define the distance to the mean $t_{\gamma}(f):=f-\mathbb{E}_{\gamma}[f],$ and denote the closure in $L^2(E,\gamma)$ as $E_a^{\gamma}:=\operatorname{clos}\left\{(t_{\gamma}(f_n))_{n}\colon\ f\in E'\right\}$. Define the covariance operator $\overline{R_{\gamma}}:E_a^{\gamma}\to (E')^*$ extended to the closure as

$$\overline{R_{\gamma}}(f)(g)=\langle f,g-\mathbb{E}_{\gamma}[g]\rangle_{L^2(\gamma)}$$.

Define the norm

$$\|h\|_{H_\gamma}:=\sup\{f(h)\colon f\in E',\; \overline{R_{\gamma}}(f)(f) \leq 1\},$$

then the Cameron–Martin space $H_\gamma$ of $\gamma$ in $E$ is

$$H_\gamma=\{h\in E\colon \|h\|_{H_\gamma}<\infty\}$$.

If for $h\in E$ there exists an $g\in E_a^{\gamma}$ such that $h=\overline{R_{\gamma}}(g)$ then $h\in H_\gamma$ and $\|h\|_{H_\gamma} = \|g\|_{L^2(\gamma)}$. Further there is equivalence $\gamma_h \sim \gamma$ with Radon-Nikodým density

$$\frac{d\gamma_h}{d\gamma}=\exp\left(g(x)-\frac{1}{2}\|h\|_{H_\gamma}^2\right).$$

If $h\not\in H_\gamma$ the two measures are singular.

== Integration by parts ==
The Cameron–Martin formula gives rise to an integration by parts formula on $E$: if $F : E \to \mathbf{R}$ has bounded Fréchet derivative $\mathrm{D}F : E \to \operatorname{Lin}(E; \mathbf{R}) = E^*$, integrating the Cameron–Martin formula with respect to Wiener measure on both sides gives

$$\int_{E} F(x + t i(h)) \, \mathrm{d} \gamma (x) = \int_{E} F(x) \exp \left( t \langle h, x \rangle^{\sim} - \tfrac{1}{2} t^2 \| h \|_{H}^{2} \right) \, \mathrm{d} \gamma (x)$$

for any $t \in \mathbf{R}$. Formally differentiating with respect to $t$ and evaluating at $t = 0$ gives the integration by parts formula

$$\int_E \mathrm{D} F(x) (i(h)) \, \mathrm{d} \gamma (x) = \int_E F(x) \langle h, x \rangle^\sim \, \mathrm{d} \gamma (x).$$

Comparison with the divergence theorem of vector calculus suggests

$$\mathop{\mathrm{div}} [V_h] (x) = - \langle h, x \rangle^\sim,$$

where $V_h : E \to E$ is the constant "vector field" $V_h(x) = i(h)$ for all $x \in E$. The wish to consider more general vector fields and to think of stochastic integrals as "divergences" leads to the study of stochastic processes and the Malliavin calculus, and, in particular, the Clark–Ocone theorem and its associated integration by parts formula.

== An application ==
Using Cameron–Martin theorem one may establish (See Liptser and Shiryayev 1977, p. 280) that for a $q \times q$ symmetric non-negative definite matrix $H(t)$ whose elements $H_{j, k}(t)$ are continuous and satisfy the condition

$$\int_0^T \sum_{j,k=1} ^q |H_{j,k}(t)|\,dt < \infty,$$

it holds for a $q$−dimensional Wiener process $w(t)$ that

$$E \left[ \exp \left( -\int_0^T w(t)^*H(t)w(t) \, dt \right) \right] = \exp \left[ \tfrac{1}{2} \int_0^T \operatorname{tr} (G(t)) \, dt \right],$$

where $G(t)$ is a $q \times q$ nonpositive definite matrix which is a unique solution of the matrix-valued Riccati differential equation

$$\frac{dG(t)}{dt} = 2H(t)-G^2(t)$$

with the boundary condition $G(T) = 0$.

In the special case of a one-dimensional Brownian motion where $H(t)=1/2$, the unique solution is $G(t)=\tanh(t-T)$, and we have the original formula as established by Cameron and Martin:
$$E\left[\exp\left(-\tfrac12\int_0^T w(t)^2\,dt\right)\right] = \frac{1}{\sqrt{\cosh T}}.$$

== See also ==
- Girsanov theorem – Theorem on changes in stochastic processes
- Sazonov's theorem
