= Uniform topology =

In mathematics, the uniform topology on a space may mean:

- In functional analysis, it sometimes refers to a polar topology on a topological vector space.
- In general topology, it is the topology carried by a uniform space.
- In real analysis, it is the topology of uniform convergence.
