= Malliavin derivative =

In mathematics, the Malliavin derivative is a notion of derivative in the Malliavin calculus. Intuitively, it is the notion of derivative appropriate to paths in classical Wiener space, which are "usually" not differentiable in the usual sense.

== Definition ==
Let $H$ be the Cameron–Martin space, and $C_{0}$ denote classical Wiener space:

$$H := \{ f \in W^{1,2} ([0, T]; \mathbb{R}^{n}) \;|\; f(0) = 0 \} := \{ \text{paths starting at 0 with first derivative in } L^{2} \}$$;

$$C_{0} := C_{0} ([0, T]; \mathbb{R}^{n}) := \{ \text{continuous  paths starting at 0} \};$$

By the Sobolev embedding theorem, $H \subset C_0$. Let

$$i : H \to C_{0}$$

denote the inclusion map.

Suppose that $F : C_{0} \to \mathbb{R}$ is Fréchet differentiable. Then the Fréchet derivative is a map

$$\mathrm{D} F : C_{0} \to \mathrm{Lin} (C_{0}; \mathbb{R});$$

i.e., for paths $\sigma \in C_{0}$, $\mathrm{D} F (\sigma)\;$ is an element of $C_{0}^{*}$, the dual space to $C_{0}\;$. Denote by $\mathrm{D}_{H} F(\sigma)\;$ the continuous linear map $H \to \mathbb{R}$ defined by

$$\mathrm{D}_{H} F (\sigma) := \mathrm{D} F (\sigma) \circ i : H \to \mathbb{R},$$

sometimes known as the H-derivative. Now define $\nabla_{H} F : C_{0} \to H$ to be the adjoint of $\mathrm{D}_{H} F\;$ in the sense that

$$\int_0^T \left(\partial_t \nabla_H F(\sigma)\right) \cdot \partial_t h := \langle \nabla_{H} F (\sigma), h \rangle_{H} = \left( \mathrm{D}_{H} F \right) (\sigma) (h) = \lim_{t \to 0} \frac{F (\sigma + t i(h)) - F(\sigma)}{t}.$$

Then the Malliavin derivative $\mathrm{D}_{t}$ is defined by

$$\left( \mathrm{D}_{t} F \right) (\sigma) := \frac{\partial}{\partial t} \left( \left( \nabla_{H} F \right) (\sigma) \right).$$

The domain of $\mathrm{D}_{t}$ is the set $\mathbf{F}$ of all Fréchet differentiable real-valued functions on $C_{0}\;$; the codomain is $L^{2} ([0, T]; \mathbb{R}^{n})$.

The Skorokhod integral $\delta\;$ is defined to be the adjoint of the Malliavin derivative:

$$\delta := \left( \mathrm{D}_{t} \right)^{*} : \operatorname{image} \left( \mathrm{D}_{t} \right) \subseteq L^{2} ([0, T]; \mathbb{R}^{n}) \to \mathbf{F}^{*} = \mathrm{Lin} (\mathbf{F}; \mathbb{R}).$$

== See also ==
- H-derivative
