= Locally finite measure =

In mathematics, a locally finite measure is a measure for which every point of the measure space has a neighbourhood of finite measure.

== Definition ==
Let $(X, T)$ be a Hausdorff topological space and let $\Sigma$ be a $\sigma$-algebra on $X$ that contains the topology $T$ (so that every open set is a measurable set, and $\Sigma$ is at least as fine as the Borel $\sigma$-algebra on $X$). A measure/signed measure/complex measure $\mu$ defined on $\Sigma$ is called locally finite if, for every point $p$ of the space $X,$ there is an open neighbourhood $N_p$ of $p$ such that the $\mu$-measure of $N_p$ is finite.

In more condensed notation, $\mu$ is locally finite if and only if $\text{for all } p \in X, \text{ there exists } N_p \in T \mbox{ such that } p \in N_p \mbox{ and } \left|\mu\left(N_p\right)\right| < + \infty.$

== Examples ==
1. Any probability measure on $X$ is locally finite, since it assigns unit measure to the whole space. Similarly, any measure that assigns finite measure to the whole space is locally finite.
2. Lebesgue measure on Euclidean space is locally finite.
3. By definition, any Radon measure is locally finite.
4. The counting measure is sometimes locally finite and sometimes not: the counting measure on the integers with their usual discrete topology is locally finite, but the counting measure on the real line with its usual Borel topology is not.

== See also ==
- Inner regular measure – Mathematical measure for topological spaces
- Strictly positive measure
