= Regular measure =

Mathematical measure for topological spaces

In mathematics, a regular measure on a topological space is a measure for which every measurable set can be approximated from above by open measurable sets and from below by compact measurable sets.

== Definition ==
Let $(X,\mathcal{T})$ be a topological space and let $\Sigma$ be a σ-algebra on $X$. Let $\mu$ be a measure on $(X,\Sigma)$. A measurable subset $A$ of $X$ is said to be inner regular if
$$\mu (A) = \sup \{ \mu (F) \mid F \subseteq A, F \text{ compact and measurable} \}$$

This property is sometimes referred to in words as "approximation from within by compact sets." Some authors use the term tight as a synonym for inner regular. This use of the term is closely related to tightness of a family of measures, since a finite measure μ is inner regular if and only if, for all ε>0, there is some compact subset K of X such that μ(X\K)<ε. This is precisely the condition that the singleton collection of measures {μ} is tight.

A measurable subset A is said to be outer regular if

$$\mu (A) = \inf \{ \mu (G) \mid G \supseteq A, G \text{ open and measurable} \}$$

It is said to be regular if it is both inner and outer regular.

If these properties are verified for every measurable subsets, then the measure is also said to be (inner/outer) regular.

== Examples ==
=== Regular measures ===
- The Lebesgue measure on the real line is a regular measure: see the regularity theorem for Lebesgue measure.
- Any Baire probability measure on any locally compact σ-compact Hausdorff space is a regular measure.
- Any Borel probability measure on a locally compact Hausdorff space with a countable base for its topology, or compact metric space, or Radon space, is regular.

=== Inner regular measures that are not outer regular ===
- An example of a measure on the real line with its usual topology that is not outer regular is the measure $\mu$ where $\mu(\emptyset) = 0$, $\mu\left( \{1\}\right) = 0$, and $\mu(A) = \infty$ for any other set $A$.
- The Borel measure on the plane that assigns to any Borel set the sum of the (1-dimensional) measures of its horizontal sections is inner regular but not outer regular, as every non-empty open set has infinite measure. A variation of this example is a disjoint union of an uncountable number of copies of the real line with Lebesgue measure.
- An example of a Borel measure $\mu$ on a locally compact Hausdorff space that is inner regular, σ-finite, and locally finite but not outer regular is given by Bourbaki (2004, Chapter IV, Exercise 5 of section 1) as follows. The topological space $X$ has as its underlying set the subset of the real plane given by the y-axis $\{0\}\times\mathbb{R}$ together with the points (1/n,m/n^{2}) for all m,n positive integers. The topology is given as follows: The single points (1/n,m/n^{2}) are all open sets. A base of neighborhoods of the point (0,y) is given by wedges consisting of all points in X of the form (u,v) with |v − y| ≤ |u| ≤ 1/n for a positive integer n. This space X is locally compact. The measure μ is given by letting the y-axis have measure 0 and letting the point (1/n,m/n^{2}) have measure 1/n^{3}. This measure is inner regular and locally finite, but is not outer regular as any open set containing the y-axis has measure infinity.

=== Outer regular measures that are not inner regular ===
- If μ is the inner regular measure in the previous example, and M is the measure given by M(S) = inf_{U⊇S} μ(U) where the inf is taken over all open sets containing the Borel set S, then M is an outer regular locally finite Borel measure on a locally compact Hausdorff space that is not inner regular in the strong sense, though all open sets are inner regular so it is inner regular in the weak sense. The measures M and μ coincide on all open sets, all compact sets, and all sets on which M has finite measure. The y-axis has infinite M-measure though all compact subsets of it have measure 0.
- A measurable cardinal with the discrete topology has a Borel probability measure such that every compact subset has measure 0, so this measure is outer regular but not inner regular. The existence of measurable cardinals cannot be proved in ZF set theory but (as of 2013) is thought to be consistent with it.

=== Measures that are neither inner nor outer regular ===
- The space of all ordinals at most equal to the first uncountable ordinal Ω, with the topology generated by open intervals, is a compact Hausdorff space. The measure that assigns measure 1 to Borel sets containing an unbounded closed subset of the countable ordinals and assigns 0 to other Borel sets is a Borel probability measure that is neither inner regular nor outer regular.

== See also ==
- Borel regular measure
- Radon measure
- Regularity theorem for Lebesgue measure
