= Radon measure =

Type of mathematical measure

In mathematics, specifically measure theory, a Radon measure, named after Johann Radon, is a measure on the σ-algebra of Borel sets of a Hausdorff space that is finite on all compact sets, outer regular on all Borel sets, and inner regular on open sets. These conditions guarantee that the measure is "compatible" with the topology of the space, and most measures used in mathematical analysis and in number theory are indeed Radon measures.

== Motivation ==
A common problem is to find a good notion of a measure on a topological space that is compatible with the topology in some sense. One way to do this is to define a measure on the Borel sets of the topological space. In general, there are several problems with this approach: for example, such a measure may not have a well defined support. Another approach to measure theory is to restrict to locally compact Hausdorff spaces, and only consider the measures that correspond to positive linear functionals on the space of continuous functions with compact support (some authors use this as the definition of a Radon measure). This produces a good theory with no pathological problems, but does not apply to spaces that are not locally compact, such as most Hilbert spaces. If there is no restriction to non-negative measures and complex measures are allowed, then Radon measures can be defined as the continuous dual space on the space of continuous functions with compact support. If such a Radon measure is real then it can be decomposed into the difference of two positive measures. Furthermore, an arbitrary Radon measure can be decomposed into four positive Radon measures, where the real and imaginary parts of the functional are each the differences of two positive Radon measures.

The theory of Radon measures has most of the good properties of the usual theory for locally compact spaces, but applies to all Hausdorff topological spaces. The idea of the definition of a Radon measure is to find some properties that characterize the measures on locally compact spaces corresponding to positive functionals, and use these properties as the definition of a Radon measure on an arbitrary Hausdorff space.

== Definitions ==
Let m be a measure on the σ-algebra of Borel sets of a Hausdorff topological space X.

- The measure m is called inner regular or tight if, for every open set U, m(U) equals the supremum of m(K) over all compact subsets K of U.
- The measure m is called outer regular if, for every Borel set B, m(B) equals the infimum of m(U) over all open sets U containing B.
- The measure m is called locally finite if every point of X has a neighborhood U for which m(U) is finite.

If m is locally finite, then it follows that m is finite on compact sets, and for locally compact Hausdorff spaces, the converse holds, too. Thus, in this case, local finiteness may be equivalently replaced by finiteness on compact subsets.

The measure m is called a Radon measure if it is inner regular and locally finite. In many situations, such as finite measures on locally compact spaces, this also implies outer regularity (see also Radon spaces).

(It is possible to extend the theory of Radon measures to non-Hausdorff spaces, essentially by replacing the word "compact" by "closed compact" everywhere. However, there seem to be almost no applications of this extension.)

== Radon measures on locally compact spaces ==
When the underlying measure space is a locally compact topological space, the definition of a Radon measure can be expressed in terms of continuous linear functionals on the space of continuous functions with compact support. This makes it possible to develop measure and integration in terms of functional analysis, an approach taken by Bourbaki and a number of other authors.

=== Measures ===
In what follows X denotes a locally compact topological space. The continuous real-valued functions with compact support on X form a vector space K(X) = C_{c}(X), which can be given a natural locally convex topology. Indeed, K(X) is the union of the spaces K(X, K) of continuous functions with support contained in compact sets K. Each of the spaces K(X, K) carries naturally the topology of uniform convergence, which makes it into a Banach space. But as a union of topological spaces is a special case of a direct limit of topological spaces, the space K(X) can be equipped with the direct limit locally convex topology induced by the spaces K(X, K); this topology is finer than the topology of uniform convergence.

If m is a Radon measure on $X,$ then the mapping
$$I : f \mapsto \int f(x)\, m(dx)$$

is a continuous positive linear map from K(X) to R. Positivity means that I(f) ≥ 0 whenever f is a non-negative function. Continuity with respect to the direct limit topology defined above is equivalent to the following condition: for every compact subset K of X there exists a constant M_{K} such that, for every continuous real-valued function f on X with support contained in K,
$$|I(f)| \leq M_K  \sup_{x\in X} |f(x)|.$$

Conversely, by the Riesz–Markov–Kakutani representation theorem, each positive linear form on K(X) arises as integration with respect to a unique regular Borel measure.

A real-valued Radon measure is defined to be any continuous linear form on K(X); they are precisely the differences of two Radon measures. This gives an identification of real-valued Radon measures with the dual space of the locally convex space K(X). These real-valued Radon measures need not be signed measures. For example, sin(x) dx is a real-valued Radon measure, but is not even an extended signed measure as it cannot be written as the difference of two measures at least one of which is finite.

Some authors use the preceding approach to define positive Radon measures to be the positive linear forms on K(X). In this set-up it is common to use a terminology in which Radon measures in the above sense are called positive measures and real-valued Radon measures as above are called (real) measures.

=== Integration ===
To complete the buildup of measure theory for locally compact spaces from the functional-analytic viewpoint, it is necessary to extend measure (integral) from compactly supported continuous functions. This can be done for real or complex-valued functions in several steps as follows:

1. Definition of the upper integral μ*(g) of a lower semicontinuous positive (real-valued) function g as the supremum (possibly infinite) of the positive numbers μ(h) for compactly supported continuous functions h ≤ g;
2. Definition of the upper integral μ*(f) for an arbitrary positive (real-valued) function f as the infimum of upper integrals μ*(g) for lower semi-continuous functions g ≥ f;
3. Definition of the vector space F = F(X, μ) as the space of all functions f on X for which the upper integral μ*(|f|) of the absolute value is finite; the upper integral of the absolute value defines a semi-norm on F, and F is a complete space with respect to the topology defined by the semi-norm;
4. Definition of the space L^{1}(X, μ) of integrable functions as the closure inside F of the space of continuous compactly supported functions.
5. Definition of the integral for functions in L^{1}(X, μ) as extension by continuity (after verifying that μ is continuous with respect to the topology of L^{1}(X, μ));
6. Definition of the measure of a set as the integral (when it exists) of the indicator function of the set.

It is possible to verify that these steps produce a theory identical with the one that starts from a Radon measure defined as a function that assigns a number to each Borel set of X.

The Lebesgue measure on R can be introduced by a few ways in this functional-analytic set-up. First, it is possibly to rely on an "elementary" integral such as the Daniell integral or the Riemann integral for integrals of continuous functions with compact support, as these are integrable for all the elementary definitions of integrals. The measure (in the sense defined above) defined by elementary integration is precisely the Lebesgue measure. Second, if one wants to avoid reliance on Riemann or Daniell integral or other similar theories, it is possible to develop first the general theory of Haar measures and define the Lebesgue measure as the Haar measure λ on R that satisfies the normalisation condition λ([0, 1]) = 1.

== Examples ==
The following are all examples of Radon measures:

- Lebesgue measure on Euclidean space (restricted to the Borel subsets);
- Haar measure on any locally compact topological group;
- Dirac measure on any topological space;
- Gaussian measure on Euclidean space ℝ^{n} with its Borel sigma algebra;
- Probability measures on the σ-algebra of Borel sets of any Polish space. This example not only generalizes the previous example, but includes many measures on non-locally compact spaces, such as Wiener measure on the space of real-valued continuous functions on the interval [0, 1].
- Counting measure on any finite space
- A measure on $\mathbb R^n$ is a Radon measure if and only if it is a locally finite Borel measure.

The following are not examples of Radon measures:

- Counting measure on Euclidean space is an example of a measure that is not a Radon measure, since it is not locally finite.
- The space of ordinals at most equal to Ω, the first uncountable ordinal with the order topology is a compact topological space. The measure which equals 1 on any Borel set that contains an uncountable closed subset of [1, Ω), and 0 otherwise, is Borel but not Radon, as the one-point set {Ω} has measure zero but any open neighbourhood of it has measure 1.
- Let X be the interval [0, 1) equipped with the topology generated by the collection of half open intervals {[a, b) : 0 ≤ a < b ≤ 1}. This topology is sometimes called Sorgenfrey line. On this topological space, standard Lebesgue measure is not Radon since it is not inner regular, since compact sets are at most countable.
- Let Z be a Bernstein set in [0, 1] (or any Polish space). Then no measure which vanishes at points on Z is a Radon measure, since any compact set in Z is countable.
- Standard product measure on (0, 1)^{κ} for uncountable κ is not a Radon measure, since any compact set is contained within a product of uncountably many closed intervals, each of which is shorter than 1.

We note that, intuitively, the Radon measure is useful in mathematical finance particularly for working with Lévy processes because it has the properties of both Lebesgue and Dirac measures, as unlike the Lebesgue, a Radon measure on a single point is not necessarily of measure 0.

== Basic properties ==
=== Moderated Radon measures ===
Given a Radon measure m on a space X, we can define another measure M (on the Borel sets) by putting

$$M(B) = \inf\{ m(V) \mid V \text{ is an open set with } B \subseteq V \subseteq X \} .$$

The measure M is outer regular, and locally finite, and inner regular for open sets. It coincides with m on compact and open sets, and m can be reconstructed from M as the unique inner regular measure that is the same as M on compact sets. The measure m is called moderated if M is σ-finite; in this case the measures m and M are the same. (If m is σ-finite this does not imply that M is σ-finite, so being moderated is stronger than being σ-finite.)

On a hereditarily Lindelöf space every Radon measure is moderated.

An example of a measure m that is σ-finite but not moderated as follows. The topological space X has as underlying set the subset of the real plane given by the y-axis of points (0, y) together with the points (1/n, m/n^{2}) with m, n positive integers. The topology is given as follows. The single points (1/n, m/n^{2}) are all open sets. A base of neighborhoods of the point (0, y) is given by wedges consisting of all points in X of the form (u, v) with |v − y| ≤ |u| ≤ 1/n for a positive integer n. This space X is locally compact. The measure m is given by letting the y-axis have measure 0 and letting the point (1/n, m/n^{2}) have measure 1/n^{3}. This measure is inner regular and locally finite, but is not outer regular as any open set containing the y-axis has measure infinity. In particular the y-axis has m-measure 0 but M-measure infinity.

=== Radon spaces ===
A topological space is called a Radon space if every finite Borel measure is a Radon measure, and strongly Radon if every locally finite Borel measure is a Radon measure. Any Suslin space is strongly Radon, and moreover every Radon measure is moderated.

=== Duality ===
On a locally compact Hausdorff space, Radon measures correspond to positive linear functionals on the space of continuous functions with compact support. This is not surprising as this property is the main motivation for the definition of Radon measure.

=== Metric space structure ===
The pointed cone M_{+}(X) of all (positive) Radon measures on X can be given the structure of a complete metric space by defining the Radon distance between two measures m_{1}, m_{2} ∈ M_{+}(X) to be
$$\rho (m_{1}, m_{2}) = \sup \left\{ \left. \int_{X} f(x) (m_1 - m_2) (dx) \ \right| \mathrm{continuous\,} f : X \to [-1, 1] \subset \mathbb{R} \right\}.$$

This metric has some limitations. For example, the space of Radon probability measures on X,
$$\mathcal{P} (X) = \{ m \in \mathcal{M}_{+} (X) \mid m (X) = 1 \},$$
is not sequentially compact with respect to the Radon metric: i.e., it is not guaranteed that any sequence of probability measures will have a subsequence that is convergent with respect to the Radon metric, which presents difficulties in certain applications. On the other hand, if X is a compact metric space, then the Wasserstein metric turns P(X) into a compact metric space.

Convergence in the Radon metric implies weak convergence of measures:
$$\rho (m_{n}, m) \to 0 \Rightarrow m_{n} \rightharpoonup m,$$
but the converse implication is false in general. Convergence of measures in the Radon metric is sometimes known as strong convergence, as contrasted with weak convergence.

== See also ==
- Radonifying function
- Vague topology
