= Strictly positive measure =

Type of measure in measure theory

In mathematics, strict positivity is a concept in measure theory. Intuitively, a strictly positive measure is one that is "nowhere zero", or that is zero "only on points".

== Definition ==
Let $(X, T)$ be a Hausdorff topological space and let $\Sigma$ be a $\sigma$-algebra on $X$ that contains the topology $T$ (so that every open set is a measurable set, and $\Sigma$ is at least as fine as the Borel $\sigma$-algebra on $X$). Then a measure $\mu$ on $(X, \Sigma)$ is called strictly positive if every non-empty open subset of $X$ has strictly positive measure.

More concisely, $\mu$ is strictly positive if and only if for all $U \in T$ such that $U \neq \varnothing, \mu (U) > 0.$

== Examples ==
- Counting measure on any set $X$ (with any topology) is strictly positive.
- Dirac measure is usually not strictly positive unless the topology $T$ is particularly "coarse" (contains "few" sets). For example, $\delta_0$ on the real line $\R$ with its usual Borel topology and $\sigma$-algebra is not strictly positive; however, if $\R$ is equipped with the trivial topology $T = \{\varnothing, \R\},$ then $\delta_0$ is strictly positive. This example illustrates the importance of the topology in determining strict positivity.
- Gaussian measure on Euclidean space $\R^n$ (with its Borel topology and $\sigma$-algebra) is strictly positive.
  - Wiener measure on the space of continuous paths in $\R^n$ is a strictly positive measure — Wiener measure is an example of a Gaussian measure on an infinite-dimensional space.
- Lebesgue measure on $\R^n$ (with its Borel topology and $\sigma$-algebra) is strictly positive.
- The trivial measure is never strictly positive, regardless of the space $X$ or the topology used, except when $X$ is empty.

== Properties ==
- If $\mu$ and $\nu$ are two measures on a measurable topological space $(X, \Sigma),$ with $\mu$ strictly positive and also absolutely continuous with respect to $\nu,$ then $\nu$ is strictly positive as well. The proof is simple: let $U \subseteq X$ be an arbitrary open set; since $\mu$ is strictly positive, $\mu(U) > 0;$ by absolute continuity, $\nu(U) > 0$ as well.
- Hence, strict positivity is an invariant with respect to equivalence of measures.
- Any uniformly distributed measure on a metric space is strictly positive. Because if there is an nonempty open set with zero measure, then the measure of some open balls will be zero, which contradicts the definition of uniformly distributed.

== See also ==
- Support (measure theory) – Concept in mathematics − a measure is strictly positive if and only if its support is the whole space.
