= Borel measure =

Measure defined on all open sets of a topological space

In mathematics, specifically in measure theory, a Borel measure on a topological space is a measure that is defined on all open sets (and thus on all Borel sets). Some authors require additional restrictions on the measure, as described below.

== Formal definition ==
Let $X$ be a locally compact Hausdorff space, and let $\mathfrak{B}(X)$ be the smallest σ-algebra that contains the open sets of $X$; this is known as the σ-algebra of Borel sets. A Borel measure is any measure $\mu$ defined on the σ-algebra of Borel sets. A few authors require in addition that $\mu$ is locally finite, meaning that every point has an open neighborhood with finite measure. For Hausdorff spaces, this implies that $\mu(C)<\infty$ for every compact set $C$; and for locally compact Hausdorff spaces, the two conditions are equivalent. If a Borel measure $\mu$ is both inner regular and outer regular, it is called a regular Borel measure. If $\mu$ is both inner regular, outer regular, and locally finite, it is called a Radon measure. Alternatively, if a regular Borel measure $\mu$ is tight, it is a Radon measure.

If $X$ is a Polish space, then every locally finite Borel measure on $X$ is a Radon measure.

== On the real line ==
The real line $\mathbb R$ with its usual topology is a locally compact Hausdorff space; hence we can define a Borel measure on it. In this case, $\mathfrak{B}(\mathbb R)$ is the smallest σ-algebra that contains the open intervals of $\mathbb R$. While there are many Borel measures μ, the choice of Borel measure that assigns $\mu((a,b])=b-a$ for every half-open interval $(a,b]$ is sometimes called "the" Borel measure on $\mathbb R$. This measure turns out to be the restriction to the Borel σ-algebra of the Lebesgue measure $\lambda$, which is a complete measure and is defined on the Lebesgue σ-algebra. The Lebesgue σ-algebra is actually the completion of the Borel σ-algebra, which means that it is the smallest σ-algebra that contains all the Borel sets and can be equipped with a complete measure. Also, the Borel measure and the Lebesgue measure coincide on the Borel sets (i.e., $\lambda(E)=\mu(E)$ for every Borel measurable set, where $\mu$ is the Borel measure described above). This idea extends to finite-dimensional spaces $\mathbb R^n$ (the Cramér–Wold theorem, below) but does not hold, in general, for infinite-dimensional spaces. Infinite-dimensional Lebesgue measures do not exist.

== Product spaces ==
If X and Y are second-countable, Hausdorff topological spaces, then the set of Borel subsets $B(X\times Y)$ of their product coincides with the product of the sets $B(X)\times B(Y)$ of Borel subsets of X and Y. That is, the Borel functor

$$\mathbf{Bor}\colon\mathbf{Top}_\mathrm{2CHaus}\to\mathbf{Meas}$$

from the category of second-countable Hausdorff spaces to the category of measurable spaces preserves finite products.

== Applications ==
=== Lebesgue–Stieltjes integral ===
The Lebesgue–Stieltjes integral is the ordinary Lebesgue integral with respect to a measure known as the Lebesgue–Stieltjes measure, which may be associated to any function of bounded variation on the real line. The Lebesgue–Stieltjes measure is a regular Borel measure, and conversely every regular Borel measure on the real line is of this kind.

=== Laplace transform ===
One can define the Laplace transform of a finite Borel measure μ on the real line by the Lebesgue integral

$$(\mathcal{L}\mu)(s) = \int_{[0,\infty)} e^{-st}\,d\mu(t).$$

An important special case is where μ is a probability measure or, even more specifically, the Dirac delta function. In operational calculus, the Laplace transform of a measure is often treated as though the measure came from a distribution function f. In that case, to avoid potential confusion, one often writes

$$(\mathcal{L}f)(s) = \int_{0^-}^\infty e^{-st}f(t)\,dt$$

where the lower limit of 0^{−} is shorthand notation for

$$\lim_{\varepsilon\downarrow 0}\int_{-\varepsilon}^\infty.$$

This limit emphasizes that any point mass located at 0 is entirely captured by the Laplace transform. Although with the Lebesgue integral, it is not necessary to take such a limit, it does appear more naturally in connection with the Laplace–Stieltjes transform.

=== Moment problem ===
One can define the moments of a finite Borel measure μ on the real line by the integral

$$m_n = \int_a^b x^n\,d\mu(x).$$

For $(a,b)=(-\infty,\infty),\;(0,\infty),\;(0,1)$ these correspond to the Hamburger moment problem, the Stieltjes moment problem and the Hausdorff moment problem, respectively. The question or problem to be solved is, given a collection of such moments, is there a corresponding measure? For the Hausdorff moment problem, the corresponding measure is unique. For the other variants, in general, there are an infinite number of distinct measures that give the same moments.

=== Hausdorff dimension and Frostman's lemma ===
Given a Borel measure μ on a metric space X such that μ(X) > 0 and μ(B(x, r)) ≤ r^{s} holds for some constant s > 0 and for every ball B(x, r) in X, then the Hausdorff dimension dim_{Haus}(X) ≥ s. A partial converse is provided by the Frostman lemma:

Lemma: Let A be a Borel subset of R^{n}, and let s > 0. Then the following are equivalent:

- H^{s}(A) > 0, where H^{s} denotes the s-dimensional Hausdorff measure.
- There is an (unsigned) Borel measure μ satisfying μ(A) > 0, and such that

$$\mu(B(x,r))\le r^s$$

holds for all x ∈ R^{n} and r > 0.

=== Cramér–Wold theorem ===
The Cramér–Wold theorem in measure theory states that a Borel probability measure on $\mathbb R^k$ is uniquely determined by the totality of its one-dimensional projections. It is used as a method for proving joint convergence results. The theorem is named after Harald Cramér and Herman Ole Andreas Wold.

== See also ==
- Jacobi operator
