= Equivalence (measure theory) =

Property of two measures in measure theory

In mathematics, and specifically in measure theory, equivalence is a notion of two measures being qualitatively similar. Specifically, the two measures agree on which events have measure zero.

== Definition ==
Let $\mu$ and $\nu$ be two measures on the measurable space $(X, \mathcal A),$ and let
$$\mathcal{N}_\mu := \{A \in \mathcal{A} \mid \mu(A) = 0\}$$
and
$$\mathcal{N}_\nu := \{A \in \mathcal{A} \mid \nu(A) = 0\}$$
be the sets of $\mu$-null sets and $\nu$-null sets, respectively. Then the measure $\nu$ is said to be absolutely continuous in reference to $\mu$ if and only if $\mathcal N_\nu \supseteq \mathcal N_\mu.$ This is denoted as $\nu \ll \mu.$

The two measures are called equivalent if and only if $\mu \ll \nu$ and $\nu \ll \mu,$ which is denoted as $\mu \sim \nu.$ That is, two measures are equivalent if they satisfy $\mathcal N_\mu = \mathcal N_\nu.$

== Examples ==
=== On the real line ===
Define the two measures on the real line as
$$\mu(A)= \int_A \mathbf 1_{[0,1]}(x) \mathrm dx$$
$$\nu(A)= \int_A x^2 \mathbf 1_{[0,1]}(x) \mathrm dx$$
for all Borel sets $A.$ Then $\mu$ and $\nu$ are equivalent, since all sets outside of $[0,1]$ have $\mu$ and $\nu$ measure zero, and a set inside $[0,1]$ is a $\mu$-null set or a $\nu$-null set exactly when it is a null set with respect to Lebesgue measure.

=== Abstract measure space ===
Look at some measurable space $(X, \mathcal A)$ and let $\mu$ be the counting measure, so
$$\mu(A) = |A|,$$
where $|A|$ is the cardinality of the set a. So the counting measure has only one null set, which is the empty set. That is, $\mathcal N_\mu = \{\varnothing\}.$ So by the second definition, any other measure $\nu$ is equivalent to the counting measure if and only if it also has just the empty set as the only $\nu$-null set.

== Supporting measures ==
A measure $\mu$ is called a supporting measure of a measure $\nu$ if $\mu$ is $\sigma$-finite and $\nu$ is equivalent to $\mu.$

== See also ==
- Equivalence of metrics
- Equivalent norms
