= Probability measure =

Measure of total value one, generalizing probability distributions

In mathematics, a probability measure is a real-valued function defined on a set of events in a σ-algebra that satisfies measure properties such as countable additivity. The difference between a probability measure and the more general notion of measure (which includes concepts like area or volume) is that a probability measure must assign value 1 to the entire space.

Intuitively, the additivity property says that the probability assigned to the union of two disjoint (mutually exclusive) events by the measure should be the sum of the probabilities of the events; for example, the value assigned to the outcome "1 or 2" in a throw of a die should be the sum of the values assigned to the outcomes "1" and "2".

Probability measures have applications in diverse fields, from physics to finance and biology.

== Definition ==
A probability measure mapping the σ-algebra for $2^3$ events to the unit interval.

The requirements for a set function $\mu$ to be a probability measure on a σ-algebra are that:

- $\mu$ must take values in the unit interval $[0, 1],$ including $0$ on the empty set and $1$ on the entire space.
- $\mu$ must satisfy the countable additivity property that for all countable collections $E_1, E_2, \ldots$ of pairwise disjoint sets:
  $$\mu\left(\bigcup_{i \in \N} E_i\right) = \sum_{i \in \N} \mu(E_i).$$

For example, given three elements 1, 2 and 3 with probabilities $1/4, 1/4$ and $1/2,$ the value assigned to $\{1, 3\}$ is $1/4 + 1/2 = 3/4,$ as in the diagram on the right.

The conditional probability based on the intersection of events defined as:
$$\mu (B \mid A) = \frac{\mu(A \cap B)}{\mu(A)}.$$
satisfies the probability function requirements so long as $\mu(A)$ is not zero.

Probability measures are distinct from the more general notion of fuzzy measures in which there is no requirement that the fuzzy values sum up to $1,$ and the additive property is replaced by an order relation based on set inclusion.

== Example applications ==
In many cases, statistical physics uses probability measures, but not all measures it uses are probability measures.

Market measures which assign probabilities to financial market spaces based on observed market movements are examples of probability measures which are of interest in mathematical finance; for example, in the pricing of financial derivatives. For instance, a risk-neutral measure is a probability measure which assumes that the current value of assets is the expected value of the future payoff taken with respect to that same risk neutral measure (i.e. calculated using the corresponding risk neutral density function), and discounted at the risk-free rate. If there is a unique probability measure that must be used to price assets in a market, then the market is called a complete market.

Not all measures that intuitively represent chance or likelihood are probability measures. For instance, although the fundamental concept of a system in statistical mechanics is a measure space, such measures are not always probability measures. In statistical physics, for sentences of the form "the probability of a system S assuming state A is p," the geometry of the system does not always lead to the definition of a probability measure under congruence, although it may do so in the case of systems with just one degree of freedom.

Probability measures are also used in mathematical biology. For instance, in comparative sequence analysis a probability measure may be defined for the likelihood that a variant may be permissible for an amino acid in a sequence.

== See also ==
- Borel measure – Measure defined on all open sets of a topological space
- Fuzzy measure – Theory of generalized measures in mathematics
- Haar measure – Left-invariant (or right-invariant) measure on locally compact topological group
- Counting measure
- Lebesgue measure – Broadest definition of sizes in integer-dimensional spaces
- Martingale measure – Probability measure
- Set function – Function from sets to numbers
- Probability distribution
