= Devil's staircase =

Devil's staircase may refer to:

== Places ==
- a path through the Aonach Eagach ridge, Scotland
- Devil's Staircase (New Zealand), a section of New Zealand State Highway 6 in Otago
- a feature on the Afon Irfon in the Cambrian Mountains, Wales
- a waterfall on the Coosa River at Wetumpka, Alabama, U.S.
- a descent on the Peak Cavern caves in Castleton, Derbyshire, England
- a path in The Silverpeaks, New Zealand
- a ridge in the White Cloud Mountains, Idaho, U.S.
- a road in Ohiya, Sri Lanka
- an intrusion dike near Sambro Island Light, near Halifax Harbour, Nova Scotia, Canada
- Devil's Staircase Wilderness, a nature reserve in the Oregon Coast Range, U.S.

== Arts and entertainment ==
- L'Escalier du diable, the thirteenth of the Études, Book II by György Ligeti
- The Devil's Staircase, a 2009 novel by Helen FitzGerald
- The Devil's Staircase, a 2011 production by Santa Clara Vanguard Drum and Bugle Corps

== Other uses ==
- a singular function in mathematics
  - Cantor function
- Baguenaudier, a disentanglement puzzle
