= Discrete measure =

Schematic representation of the Dirac measure by a line surmounted by an arrow. The Dirac measure is a discrete measure whose support is the point 0. The Dirac measure of any set containing 0 is 1, and the measure of any set not containing 0 is 0.

In mathematics, more precisely in measure theory, a measure on the real line is called a discrete measure (in respect to the Lebesgue measure) if it is concentrated on an at most countable set. The support need not be a discrete set. Geometrically, a discrete measure (on the real line, with respect to Lebesgue measure) is a collection of point masses.

== Definition and properties ==
Given two (positive) σ-finite measures $\mu$ and $\nu$ on a measurable space $(X, \Sigma)$. Then $\mu$ is said to be discrete with respect to $\nu$ if there exists an at most countable subset $S \subset X$ in $\Sigma$ such that

1. All singletons $\{s\}$ with $s \in S$ are measurable (which implies that any subset of $S$ is measurable)
2. $\nu(S)=0\,$
3. $\mu(X\setminus S)=0.\,$

A measure $\mu$ on $(X, \Sigma)$ is discrete (with respect to $\nu$) if and only if $\mu$ has the form

$$\mu = \sum_{i=1}^{\infty} a_i \delta_{s_i}$$

with $a_i \in \mathbb{R}_{>0}$ and Dirac measures $\delta_{s_i}$ on the set $S=\{s_i\}_{i\in\mathbb{N}}$ defined as

$$\delta_{s_i}(X) =
\begin{cases}
1 & \mbox { if } s_i \in X\\
0 & \mbox { if } s_i \not\in X\\
\end{cases}$$

for all $i\in\mathbb{N}$.

One can also define the concept of discreteness for signed measures. Then, instead of conditions 2 and 3 above one should ask that $\nu$ be zero on all measurable subsets of $S$ and $\mu$ be zero on measurable subsets of $X\backslash S.$

== Example on R ==
A measure $\mu$ defined on the Lebesgue measurable sets of the real line with values in $[0, \infty]$ is said to be discrete if there exists a (possibly finite) sequence of numbers

$$s_1, s_2, \dots \,$$

such that

$$\mu(\mathbb R\backslash\{s_1, s_2, \dots\})=0.$$

Notice that the first two requirements in the previous section are always satisfied for an at most countable subset of the real line if $\nu$ is the Lebesgue measure.

The simplest example of a discrete measure on the real line is the Dirac delta function $\delta.$ One has $\delta(\mathbb R\backslash\{0\})=0$ and $\delta(\{0\})=1.$

More generally, one may prove that any discrete measure on the real line has the form

$$\mu = \sum_{i} a_i \delta_{s_i}$$

for an appropriately chosen (possibly finite) sequence $s_1, s_2, \dots$ of real numbers and a sequence $a_1, a_2, \dots$ of numbers in $[0, \infty]$ of the same length.

== See also ==
- Isolated point – Point of a subset S around which there are no other points of S
- Lebesgue's decomposition theorem
- Singleton (mathematics) – Set with exactly one element
- Singular measure – measure or probability distribution whose support has zero Lebesgue (or other) measure
