= Degenerate distribution =

Probability distribution

Degenerate univariate
- Cumulative distribution function CDF for a = 0. The horizontal axis is x.
- Parameters: $a \in (-\infty,\infty)\,$
- Support: $\{a\}$
- PMF: $$\begin{matrix} 1 & \mbox{for }x=a \\ 0 & \mbox{elsewhere} \end{matrix}$$
- CDF: $$\begin{matrix} 0 & \mbox{for }x<a \\1 & \mbox{for }x\ge a \end{matrix}$$
- Mean: $a\,$
- Median: $a\,$
- Mode: $a\,$
- Variance: $0\,$
- Skewness: undefined
- Excess kurtosis: undefined
- Entropy: $0\,$
- MGF: $e^{at}\,$
- CF: $e^{iat}\,$
- PGF: $z^{a}\,$

In probability theory, a degenerate distribution on a measure space $(E, \mathcal{A}, \mu)$ is a probability distribution whose support is a null set with respect to $\mu$. For instance, in the n-dimensional space ℝ^{n} endowed with the Lebesgue measure, any distribution concentrated on a d-dimensional subspace with d < n is a degenerate distribution on ℝ^{n}. This is essentially the same notion as a singular probability measure, but the term degenerate is typically used when the distribution arises as a limit of (non-degenerate) distributions.

When the support of a degenerate distribution consists of a single point a, this distribution is a Dirac measure in a: it is the distribution of a deterministic random variable equal to a with probability 1. This is a special case of a discrete distribution; its probability mass function equals 1 in a and 0 everywhere else.

In the case of a real-valued random variable, the cumulative distribution function of the degenerate distribution localized in a is
$$F_{a}(x)=\left\{\begin{matrix} 1, & \mbox{if }x\ge a \\ 0, & \mbox{if }x<a \end{matrix}\right.$$
Such degenerate distributions often arise as limits of continuous distributions whose variance goes to 0.

== Constant random variable ==
A constant random variable is a discrete random variable that takes a constant value, regardless of any event that occurs. This is technically different from an almost surely constant random variable, which may take other values, but only on events with probability zero: Let X: Ω → ℝ be a real-valued random variable defined on a probability space (Ω, ℙ). Then X is an almost surely constant random variable if there exists $a \in \mathbb{R}$ such that
$$\mathbb{P}(X = a) = 1,$$
and is furthermore a constant random variable if
$$X(\omega) = a, \quad \forall\omega \in \Omega.$$
A constant random variable is almost surely constant, but the converse is not true, since if X is almost surely constant then there may still exist ω ∈ Ω such that X(ω) ≠ a. For practical purposes, the distinction between X being constant or almost surely constant is unimportant, since these two situation correspond to the same degenerate distribution: the Dirac measure.

Almost surely constant random variables are independent of everything — that is, if $X$ is almost surely constant, then for every event $A$ and every measurable set $B \subset \mathbb{R}$,
$$\mathbb{P}(\{X \in B\} \cap A) = \mathbb{P}(X \in B)\times\mathbb{P}(A).$$
In particular, an almost surely constant random variable is independent of itself. Moreover, this self-independence characterizes almost surely constant random variables: if a random variable is independent of itself, then it is almost surely constant.

== Higher dimensions ==
Degeneracy of a multivariate distribution in n random variables arises when the support lies in a space of dimension less than n. This occurs when at least one of the variables is a deterministic function of the others. For example, in the 2-variable case suppose that Y = aX + b for scalar random variables X and Y and scalar constants a ≠ 0 and b; here knowing the value of one of X or Y gives exact knowledge of the value of the other. All the possible points (x, y) fall on the one-dimensional line y = ax + b.

In general when one or more of n random variables are exactly linearly determined by the others, if the covariance matrix exists its rank is less than n and its determinant is 0, so it is positive semi-definite but not positive definite, and the joint probability distribution is degenerate.

Degeneracy can also occur even with non-zero covariance. For example, when scalar X is symmetrically distributed about 0 and Y is exactly given by Y = X^{2}, all possible points (x, y) fall on the parabola y = x^{2}, which is a one-dimensional subset of the two-dimensional space.
