= Singular distribution =

Distribution concentrated on a set of measure zero

A singular distribution or singular continuous distribution is a probability distribution concentrated on a set of Lebesgue measure zero, for which the probability of each point in that set is zero.

== Properties ==
Such distributions are not absolutely continuous with respect to Lebesgue measure.

A singular distribution is not a discrete probability distribution because each discrete point has a zero probability. On the other hand, neither does it have a probability density function, since the Lebesgue integral of any such function would be zero.

In general, distributions can be described as a discrete distribution (with a probability mass function), an absolutely continuous distribution (with a probability density), a singular distribution (with neither), or can be decomposed into a mixture of these.

== Example ==
An example is the Cantor distribution; its cumulative distribution function is a devil's staircase. Another is the Minkowski's question-mark distribution. Less curious examples appear in higher dimensions. For example, the upper and lower Fréchet–Hoeffding bounds are singular distributions in two dimensions.

== See also ==
- Singular measure
- Lebesgue's decomposition theorem
