= Cantor distribution =

Probability distribution

Cantor
- Cumulative distribution function
- Parameters: none
- Support: Cantor set, a subset of [0,1]
- PMF: none
- CDF: Cantor function
- Mean: 1/2
- Median: anywhere in [1/3, 2/3]
- Mode: n/a
- Variance: 1/8
- Skewness: 0
- Excess kurtosis: −8/5
- MGF: $e^{t/2} \prod_{k=1}^\infty \cosh\left(\frac{t}{3^k}\right)$
- CF: $e^{it/2} \prod_{k=1}^\infty \cos\left(\frac{t}{3^k}\right)$

The Cantor distribution is the probability distribution whose cumulative distribution function is the Cantor function.

This distribution has neither a probability density function nor a probability mass function, since although its cumulative distribution function is a continuous function, the distribution is not absolutely continuous with respect to Lebesgue measure, nor does it have any point-masses. It is thus neither a discrete nor an absolutely continuous probability distribution, nor is it a mixture of these. Rather it is an example of a singular distribution.

Its cumulative distribution function is continuous everywhere but horizontal almost everywhere, so is sometimes referred to as the Devil's staircase, although that term has a more general meaning.

== Characterization ==
The support of the Cantor distribution is the Cantor set, itself the intersection of the (countably infinitely many) sets:

$$\begin{align}
C_0 = {} & [0,1] \\[8pt]
C_1 = {} & [0,1/3]\cup[2/3,1] \\[8pt]
C_2 = {} & [0,1/9]\cup[2/9,1/3]\cup[2/3,7/9]\cup[8/9,1] \\[8pt]
C_3 = {} & [0,1/27]\cup[2/27,1/9]\cup[2/9,7/27]\cup[8/27,1/3]\cup \\[4pt]
{} & [2/3,19/27]\cup[20/27,7/9]\cup[8/9,25/27]\cup[26/27,1] \\[8pt]
C_4 = {} & \cdots
\end{align}$$

The Cantor distribution is the unique probability distribution for which for any C_{t} (t ∈ { 0, 1, 2, 3, ... }), the probability of a particular interval in C_{t} containing the Cantor-distributed random variable is identically 2^{−t} on each one of the 2^{t} intervals.

== Moments ==
It is easy to see by symmetry and being bounded that for a random variable X having this distribution, its expected value E(X) = 1/2, and that all odd central moments of X are 0.

The law of total variance can be used to find the variance var(X), as follows. For the above set C_{1}, let Y = 0 if X ∈ [0,1/3], and 1 if X ∈ [2/3,1]. Then:

$$\begin{align}
\operatorname{var}(X) & = \operatorname{E}(\operatorname{var}(X\mid Y)) +
\operatorname{var}(\operatorname{E}(X\mid Y)) \\
& = \frac{1}{9}\operatorname{var}(X) +
\operatorname{var}
\left\{
\begin{matrix} 1/6 & \mbox{with probability}\ 1/2 \\
5/6 & \mbox{with probability}\ 1/2
\end{matrix}
\right\} \\
& = \frac{1}{9}\operatorname{var}(X) + \frac{1}{9}
\end{align}$$

From this we get:

$$\operatorname{var}(X)=\frac{1}{8}.$$

A closed-form expression for any even central moment can be found by first obtaining the even cumulants

$$\kappa_{2n} = \frac{2^{2n-1} (2^{2n}-1) B_{2n}}
{n\, (3^{2n}-1)}, \,\!$$

where B_{2n} is the 2nth Bernoulli number, and then expressing the moments as functions of the cumulants.
