= Luzin N property =

Measure theory concept

In mathematics, a function f on the interval [a, b] has the Luzin N property, named after Nikolai Luzin (also called Luzin property or N property) if for all $N\subset[a,b]$ such that $\lambda(N)=0$, there holds: $\lambda(f(N))=0$, where $\lambda$ stands for the Lebesgue measure.

Note that the image of such a set N is not necessarily measurable, but since the Lebesgue measure is complete, it follows that if the Lebesgue outer measure of that set is zero, then it is measurable and its Lebesgue measure is zero as well.

== Properties ==
Any differentiable function has the Luzin N property. This extends to functions that are differentiable on a cocountable set, as the image of a countable set is countable and thus a null set, but not to functions differentiable on a conull set: The Cantor function does not have the Luzin N property, as the Lebesgue measure of the Cantor set is zero, but its image is the complete [0,1] interval.

A function f on the interval [a,b] is absolutely continuous if and only if it is continuous, is of bounded variation and has the Luzin N property.
