= Unit doublet =

General function in mathematics

Approximation of a unit doublet with two rectangles of width k as k goes to zero.

In mathematics, the unit doublet is a generalized function, the derivative of the Dirac delta function. It can be used to differentiate signals in electrical engineering: If u_{1} is the unit doublet, then

$$(x * u_1)(t) = \frac{dx(t)}{dt}$$

where $*$ is the convolution operator.

The function is zero for all values except zero, where its behaviour is interesting. Its integral over any interval enclosing zero is zero. However, the integral of its absolute value over any region enclosing zero goes to infinity. The function can be thought of as the limiting case of two rectangles, one in the second quadrant, and the other in the fourth. The width of each rectangle is k, whereas the height of each is 1/k^{2}, in the limit as k approaches zero.
