= Singular measure =

Probability distribution in measure theory

In mathematics, two positive (or signed or complex) measures $\mu$ and $\nu$ defined on a measurable space $(\Omega, \Sigma)$ are called singular if there exist two disjoint measurable sets $A, B \in \Sigma$ whose union is $\Omega$ such that $\mu$ is zero on all measurable subsets of $B$ while $\nu$ is zero on all measurable subsets of $A.$ This is denoted by $\mu \perp \nu.$

A refined form of Lebesgue's decomposition theorem decomposes a singular measure into a singular continuous measure and a discrete measure.

== Examples on R^{n} ==
As a particular case, a measure defined on the Euclidean space $\R^n$ is called singular, if it is singular with respect to the Lebesgue measure on this space. For example, the Dirac delta function is a singular measure.

Example. A discrete measure.

The Heaviside step function on the real line,
$$H(x) \ \stackrel{\mathrm{def}}{=} \begin{cases} 0, & x < 0; \\ 1, & x \geq 0; \end{cases}$$
has the Dirac delta distribution $\delta_0$ as its distributional derivative. This is a measure on the real line, a "point mass" at $0.$ However, the Dirac measure $\delta_0$ is not absolutely continuous with respect to Lebesgue measure $\lambda,$ nor is $\lambda$ absolutely continuous with respect to $\delta_0:$ $\lambda(\{0\}) = 0$ but $\delta_0(\{0\}) = 1;$ if $U$ is any non-empty open set not containing 0, then $\lambda(U) > 0$ but $\delta_0(U) = 0.$

Example. A singular continuous measure.

The Cantor distribution has a cumulative distribution function that is continuous but not absolutely continuous, and indeed its absolutely continuous part is zero: it is singular continuous.

Example. A singular continuous measure on $\R^2.$

The upper and lower Fréchet–Hoeffding bounds are singular distributions in two dimensions.

== See also ==
- Absolute continuity (measure theory) – Form of continuity for functions
- Lebesgue's decomposition theorem – Theorem in mathematical measure theory
- Singular distribution – Distribution concentrated on a set of measure zero
