= Singular function =

Type of function

The graph of the winding number of the circle map is an example of a singular function.

In mathematics, a real-valued function f on the interval [a, b] is said to be singular if it has the following properties:

- f is continuous on [a, b]. (**)
- there exists a set N of measure 0 such that for all x outside of N, the derivative f ′(x) exists and is zero; that is, the derivative of f vanishes almost everywhere.
- f is non-constant on [a, b].

A standard example of a singular function is the Cantor function, which is sometimes called the devil's staircase (a term also used for singular functions in general). There are, however, other functions that have been given that name. One is defined in terms of the circle map.

If f(x) = 0 for all x ≤ a and f(x) = 1 for all x ≥ b, then the function can be taken to represent a cumulative distribution function for a random variable which is neither a discrete random variable (since the probability is zero for each point) nor an absolutely continuous random variable (since the probability density is zero everywhere it exists).

Singular functions occur, for instance, as sequences of spatially modulated phases or structures in solids and magnets, described in a prototypical fashion by the Frenkel–Kontorova model and by the ANNNI model, as well as in some dynamical systems. Most famously, perhaps, they lie at the center of the fractional quantum Hall effect.

== When referring to functions with a singularity ==
When discussing mathematical analysis in general, or more specifically real analysis or complex analysis or differential equations, it is common for a function which contains a mathematical singularity to be referred to as a 'singular function'. This is especially true when referring to functions which diverge to infinity at a point or on a boundary. For example, one might say, "1/x becomes singular at the origin, so 1/x is a singular function."

Advanced techniques for working with functions that contain singularities have been developed in the subject called distributional or generalized function analysis. A weak derivative is defined that allows singular functions to be used in partial differential equations, etc.

== See also ==
- Absolute continuity
- Mathematical singularity
- Generalized function
- Distribution
- Minkowski's question-mark function
