= Metric derivative =

Mathematical concept

In mathematics, the metric derivative is a notion of derivative appropriate to parametrized paths in metric spaces. It generalizes the notion of "speed" or "absolute velocity" to spaces which have a notion of distance (i.e. metric spaces) but not direction (such as vector spaces).

== Definition ==
Let $(M, d)$ be a metric space. Let $E \subseteq \mathbb{R}$ have a limit point at $t \in \mathbb{R}$. Let $\gamma : E \to M$ be a path. Then the metric derivative of $\gamma$ at $t$, denoted $| \gamma' | (t)$, is defined by

$$| \gamma' | (t) := \lim_{s \to 0} \frac{d (\gamma(t + s), \gamma (t))}{| s |},$$

if this limit exists.

== Properties ==
Recall that AC^{p}(I; X) is the space of curves γ : I → X such that

$$d \left( \gamma(s), \gamma(t) \right) \leq \int_{s}^{t} m(\tau) \, \mathrm{d} \tau \mbox{ for all } [s, t] \subseteq I$$

for some m in the L^{p} space L^{p}(I; R). For γ ∈ AC^{p}(I; X), the metric derivative of γ exists for Lebesgue-almost all times in I, and the metric derivative is the smallest m ∈ L^{p}(I; R) such that the above inequality holds.

If Euclidean space $\mathbb{R}^{n}$ is equipped with its usual Euclidean norm $\| - \|$, and $\dot{\gamma} : E \to V^{*}$ is the usual Fréchet derivative with respect to time, then

$$| \gamma' | (t) = \| \dot{\gamma} (t) \|,$$

where $d(x, y) := \| x - y \|$ is the Euclidean metric.
