= Dirac measure =

Measure that is 1 if and only if a specified element is in the set

A diagram showing all possible subsets of a 3-point set $\{x,y,z\}$. The Dirac measure $\delta_x$ assigns a size of 1 to all sets in the upper-left half of the diagram and 0 to all sets in the lower-right half.

In mathematics, a Dirac measure assigns a size to a set based solely on whether it contains a particular element or not. It is one way of formalizing the idea of the Dirac delta function, an important tool in physics and other technical fields.

== Definition ==
Let $X$ be a set. For any $x\in X$, there is a measure $\delta_x$ called the Dirac measure defined on any (measurable) subset $A\subseteq X$ by

$$\delta_x (A) = 1_A(x)= \begin{cases} 0, & x \not \in A, \\ 1, & x \in A. \end{cases}$$

Here $1_A$ is the indicator function of $A$.

The name is a back-formation from the Dirac delta function; considered as a Schwartz distribution, for example on the real line, measures can be taken to be a special kind of distribution. The identity

$$\int_{X} f(y) \, \mathrm{d} \delta_x (y) = f(x),$$

which, in the form

$$\int_X f(y) \delta_x (y) \, \mathrm{d} y = f(x),$$

is often taken to be part of the definition of the "delta function", holds as a theorem of Lebesgue integration.

== Properties ==
Let $\delta_x$ denote the Dirac measure centred on some fixed point $x$ in some measurable space $(X,\Sigma)$.

The Dirac measure is a probability measure (hence a finite measure, hence a σ-finite measure) and in terms of probability it represents the almost sure outcome $x$ in the sample space $X$. We can also say that the measure is a single atom at $x$. The Dirac measures are the extreme points of the convex set of probability measures on $X$.

If $X$ is $n$-dimensional Euclidean space $\R^n$ with its usual σ-algebra and $n$-dimensional Lebesgue measure $\lambda^n$, then $\delta_x$ is a singular measure with respect to $\lambda^n$. Indeed, simply decompose $\R^n$ as $A=\R^n\setminus\{x\}$ and $B=\{x\}$ and observe that $\delta_x(A)=\lambda^n(B)=0$. As a consequence, the Dirac measure is not absolutely continuous with respect to the Lebesgue measure.

=== Topology ===
If $(X,T)$ is a topological space and $\Sigma$ is at least as fine as the Borel σ-algebra on $X$, then $\delta_x$ is a strictly positive measure if and only if the topology $T$ is such that $x$ lies within every non-empty open set; e.g. in the case of the trivial topology $T=\{\varnothing, X\}$.

Moreover, if $X$ is Hausdorff with its Borel σ-algebra, then $\delta_x$ is an inner regular measure, since singletons such as $\{x\}$ are always compact. Hence, $\delta_x$ is also a Radon measure.

If $T$ is fine enough that $\{x\}$ is closed, then the support of $\delta_x$ is $\{x\}$. Furthermore, $\delta_x$ is the only probability measure whose support is $\{x\}$. If $\{x\}$ is not closed, the support of $\delta_x$ is the closure of $\{x\}$ in $(X,T)$.

== Generalizations ==
A measure on the real line is called a discrete measure (with respect to the Lebesgue measure) if its support is at most countable. A discrete measure is thus similar to the Dirac measure, except that it is concentrated at countably many points instead of a single point.

== See also ==
- Dirac delta function
- Discrete measure
