= Support (measure theory) =

Concept in mathematics

In mathematics, the support (sometimes topological support or spectrum) of a measure $\mu$ on a measurable topological space $(X, \operatorname{Borel}(X))$ is a precise notion of where in the space $X$ the measure "lives". It is defined to be the largest (closed) subset of $X$ for which every open neighbourhood of every point of the set has positive measure.

== Motivation ==
A (non-negative) measure $\mu$ on a measurable space $(X, \Sigma)$ is really a function $\mu : \Sigma \to [0, +\infty].$ Therefore, in terms of the usual definition of support, the support of $\mu$ is a subset of the σ-algebra $\Sigma:$
$$\operatorname{supp} (\mu) := \overline{\{A \in \Sigma \,\vert\, \mu(A) \neq 0\}},$$
where the overbar denotes set closure. However, this definition is somewhat unsatisfactory: we use the notion of closure, but we do not even have a topology on $\Sigma.$ What we really want to know is where in the space $X$ the measure $\mu$ is non-zero. Consider two examples:

1. Lebesgue measure $\lambda$ on the real line $\Reals.$ It seems clear that $\lambda$ "lives on" the whole of the real line.
2. A Dirac measure $\delta_p$ at some point $p \in \Reals.$ Again, intuition suggests that the measure $\delta_p$ "lives at" the point $p,$ and nowhere else.

In light of these two examples, we can reject the following candidate definitions in favour of the one in the next section:

1. We could remove the points where $\mu$ is zero, and take the support to be the remainder $X \setminus \{x \in X \mid \mu(\{x\}) = 0\}.$ This might work for the Dirac measure $\delta_p,$ but it would definitely not work for $\lambda:$ since the Lebesgue measure of any singleton is zero, this definition would give $\lambda$ empty support.
2. By comparison with the notion of strict positivity of measures, we could take the support to be the set of all points with a neighbourhood of positive measure:
  $$\{x \in X \mid \exists N_x \text{ open} \text{ such that } (x \in N_x \text{ and } \mu(N_x) > 0)\}$$
  (or the closure of this). It is also too simplistic: by taking $N_x = X$ for all points $x \in X,$ this would make the support of every measure except the zero measure the whole of $X.$

However, the idea of "local strict positivity" is not too far from a workable definition.

== Definition ==
Let $(X, T)$ be a topological space; let $B(T)$ denote the Borel σ-algebra on $X,$ i.e. the smallest sigma algebra on $X$ that contains all open sets $U \in T.$ Let $\mu$ be a measure on $(X, B(T))$. Then the support (or spectrum) of $\mu$ is defined as the set of all points $x$ in $X$ for which every open neighbourhood $N_x$ of $x$ has positive measure:
$$\operatorname{supp} (\mu) := \{x \in X \mid \forall N_x \in T \colon (x \in N_x \Rightarrow \mu (N_x) > 0)\}.$$

Some authors prefer to take the closure of the above set. However, this is not necessary: see "Properties" below.

An equivalent definition of support is as the largest $C \in B(T)$ (with respect to inclusion) such that every open set which has non-empty intersection with $C$ has positive measure, i.e. the largest $C$ such that:
$$(\forall U \in T)(U \cap C \neq \varnothing \implies \mu (U \cap C) > 0).$$

=== Signed and complex measures ===
This definition can be extended to signed and complex measures. Suppose that $\mu : \Sigma \to [-\infty, +\infty]$ is a signed measure. Use the Hahn decomposition theorem to write
$$\mu = \mu^+ - \mu^-,$$
where $\mu^\pm$ are both non-negative measures. Then the support of $\mu$ is defined to be
$$\operatorname{supp} (\mu) := \operatorname{supp} (\mu^+) \cup \operatorname{supp} (\mu^-).$$

Similarly, if $\mu : \Sigma \to \Complex$ is a complex measure, the support of $\mu$ is defined to be the union of the supports of its real and imaginary parts.

== Properties ==
$\operatorname{supp} (\mu_1 + \mu_2) = \operatorname{supp} (\mu_1) \cup \operatorname{supp} (\mu_2)$ holds.

A measure $\mu$ on $X$ is strictly positive if and only if it has support $\operatorname{supp}(\mu) = X.$ If $\mu$ is strictly positive and $x \in X$ is arbitrary, then any open neighbourhood of $x,$ since it is an open set, has positive measure; hence, $x \in \operatorname{supp}(\mu),$ so $\operatorname{supp}(\mu) = X.$ Conversely, if $\operatorname{supp}(\mu) = X,$ then every non-empty open set (being an open neighbourhood of some point in its interior, which is also a point of the support) has positive measure; hence, $\mu$ is strictly positive. The support of a measure is closed in $X,$ as its complement is the union of the open sets of measure $0.$

In general the support of a nonzero measure may be empty: see the examples below. However, if $X$ is a Hausdorff topological space and $\mu$ is a Radon measure, a Borel set $A$ outside the support has measure zero:
$$A \subseteq X \setminus \operatorname{supp} (\mu) \implies \mu (A) = 0.$$
The converse is true if $A$ is open, but it is not true in general: it fails if there exists a point $x \in \operatorname{supp}(\mu)$ such that $\mu(\{x\}) = 0$ (e.g. Lebesgue measure). Thus, one does not need to "integrate outside the support": for any measurable function $f : X \to \Reals$ or $\Complex,$
$$\int_X f(x) \, \mathrm{d} \mu (x) = \int_{\operatorname{supp} (\mu)} f(x) \, \mathrm{d} \mu (x).$$

The concept of support of a measure and that of spectrum of a self-adjoint linear operator on a Hilbert space are closely related. Indeed, if $\mu$ is a regular Borel measure on the line $\mathbb{R},$ then the multiplication operator $(Af)(x) = xf(x)$ is self-adjoint on its natural domain
$$D(A) = \{f \in L^2(\Reals, d\mu) \mid xf(x) \in L^2(\Reals, d\mu)\}$$
and its spectrum coincides with the essential range of the identity function $x \mapsto x,$ which is precisely the support of $\mu.$

== Examples ==
=== Lebesgue measure ===
In the case of Lebesgue measure $\lambda$ on the real line $\Reals,$ consider an arbitrary point $x \in \Reals.$ Then any open neighbourhood $N_x$ of $x$ must contain some open interval $(x - \epsilon, x + \epsilon)$ for some $\epsilon > 0.$ This interval has Lebesgue measure $2 \epsilon > 0,$ so $\lambda(N_x) \geq 2 \epsilon > 0.$ Since $x \in \Reals$ was arbitrary, $\operatorname{supp}(\lambda) = \Reals.$

=== Dirac measure ===
In the case of Dirac measure $\delta_p,$ let $x \in \Reals$ and consider two cases:

1. if $x = p,$ then every open neighbourhood $N_x$ of $x$ contains $p,$ so $\delta_p(N_x) = 1 > 0.$
2. on the other hand, if $x \neq p,$ then there exists a sufficiently small open ball $B$ around $x$ that does not contain $p,$ so $\delta_p(B) = 0.$

We conclude that $\operatorname{supp}(\delta_p)$ is the closure of the singleton set $\{p\},$ which is $\{p\}$ itself.

In fact, a measure $\mu$ on the real line is a Dirac measure $\delta_p$ for some point $p$ if and only if the support of $\mu$ is the singleton set $\{p\}.$ Consequently, Dirac measure on the real line is the unique measure with zero variance (provided that the measure has variance at all).

=== A uniform distribution ===
Consider the measure $\mu$ on the real line $\Reals$ defined by
$$\mu(A) := \lambda(A \cap (0, 1))$$
i.e. a uniform measure on the open interval $(0, 1).$ A similar argument to the Dirac measure example shows that $\operatorname{supp}(\mu) = [0, 1].$ Note that the boundary points 0 and 1 lie in the support: any open set containing 0 (or 1) contains an open interval about 0 (or 1), which must intersect $(0, 1),$ and so must have positive $\mu$-measure.

=== A nontrivial measure whose support is empty ===
The space of all countable ordinals with the topology generated by "open intervals" is a locally compact Hausdorff space. The measure ("Dieudonné measure") that assigns measure 1 to Borel sets containing an unbounded closed subset and assigns 0 to other Borel sets is a Borel probability measure whose support is empty.

=== A nontrivial measure whose support has measure zero ===
On a compact Hausdorff space the support of a non-zero measure is always non-empty, but may have measure $0.$ An example of this is given by adding the first uncountable ordinal $\Omega$ to the previous example: the support of the measure is the single point $\Omega,$ which has measure $0.$
