= Absolute continuity =

Form of continuity for functions

In calculus and real analysis, absolute continuity is a regularity property of functions that is stronger than uniform continuity, and hence continuity. The notion of absolute continuity allows one to generalize the fundamental theorem of calculus, originally in the framework of Riemann integration, to Lebesgue integration. For real-valued functions on the real line, two interrelated notions appear: absolute continuity of functions and absolute continuity of measures. These two notions are generalized in different directions. The usual derivative of a function is related to the Radon–Nikodym derivative, or density, of a measure. One has the following chains of inclusions for functions over an interval:

Lipschitz continuous ⊆ absolutely continuous ⊆ uniformly continuous ⊆ continuous

and, for a bounded interval,

absolutely continuous ⊆ bounded variation ⊆ differentiable almost everywhere.

Some counterexamples which are continuous but not absolutely continuous:

- $\tan(x)$ over [0, π/2), and x^{2} over the entire real line, have non-compact domain and are not uniformly continuous nor of bounded variation;
- the Weierstrass function over any interval is uniformly continuous, but not differentiable anywhere, and hence not of bounded variation;
- the Cantor function over $x\in[0,1]$ is uniformly continuous, and is differentiable with $f'(x) = 0$ for almost all x, but does not satisfy the Fundamental Theorem: $0 = \textstyle \int_0^1 f'(x)\, dx \neq f(1)-f(0) = 1$.

== Absolute continuity of functions ==
=== Definition ===
Let $I$ be an interval in the real line $\R$. A function $f\colon I \to \R$ is absolutely continuous on $I$ if for every positive number $\varepsilon$, there is a positive number $\delta$ such that whenever a finite sequence of pairwise disjoint sub-intervals $(x_k, y_k)$ of $I$ with $x_k < y_k$ satisfies

$$\sum_{k=1}^{N} (y_k - x_k) < \delta$$

then

$$\sum_{k=1}^{N} | f(y_k) - f(x_k) | < \varepsilon.$$

The collection of all absolutely continuous functions on $I$ is denoted $\operatorname{AC}(I)$.

=== Equivalent definitions ===
The following conditions on a real-valued function f on a compact interval [a,b] are equivalent:

1. f is absolutely continuous;
2. f has a derivative f′ almost everywhere, the derivative is Lebesgue integrable, and
  $$f(x) = f(a) + \int_a^x f'(t) \, dt$$
  for all x on [a,b];
3. there exists a Lebesgue integrable function g on [a,b] such that
  $$f(x) = f(a) + \int_a^x g(t) \, dt$$
  for all x in [a,b].

If these equivalent conditions are satisfied, then necessarily any function g as in condition 3. satisfies g = f′ almost everywhere.

Equivalence between (1) and (3) is known as the fundamental theorem of Lebesgue integral calculus, due to Lebesgue.

For an equivalent definition in terms of measures see the section Relation between the two notions of absolute continuity.

=== Properties ===
- The sum and difference of two absolutely continuous functions are also absolutely continuous. If the two functions are defined on a (bounded) closed interval, then their product is also absolutely continuous. On unbounded intervals this may fail: for example on $\mathbb R$, the function $f(x)=x$ is absolutely continuous, but $f(x)^2$ is not even uniformly continuous.
- If an absolutely continuous function f is defined on a (bounded) closed interval and is nowhere zero then 1/f is absolutely continuous.
- Every absolutely continuous function (over an interval) is uniformly continuous and, therefore, continuous. Every (globally) Lipschitz-continuous function is absolutely continuous.
- If f: [a,b] → R is absolutely continuous, then it is weakly differentiable; conversely if f: [a,b] → R is weakly differentiable, then it coincides almost everywhere with an absolutely continuous function; this provides a characterization of Sobolev spaces on intervals of the real line.
- If f: [a,b] → R is absolutely continuous, then it is of bounded variation on [a,b].
- If f: [a,b] → R is absolutely continuous, then it can be written as the difference of two monotonic nondecreasing absolutely continuous functions on [a,b].
- If f: [a,b] → R is absolutely continuous, then it has the Luzin N property (that is, for any $N \subseteq [a,b]$ such that $\lambda(N) = 0$, it holds that $\lambda(f(N)) = 0$, where $\lambda$ stands for the Lebesgue measure on R).
- f: [a,b] → R is absolutely continuous if and only if it is continuous, is of bounded variation and has the Luzin N property. This statement is also known as the Banach-Zareckiǐ theorem.
- If f: I → R is absolutely continuous and g: R → R is globally Lipschitz-continuous, then the composition g $\circ$ f is absolutely continuous. Conversely, for every function g that is not globally Lipschitz continuous there exists an absolutely continuous function f such that g $\circ$ f is not absolutely continuous.

=== Examples ===
The following functions are uniformly continuous but not absolutely continuous:

- The Cantor function on [0, 1] (it is of bounded variation but not absolutely continuous);
- The function:
  $$f(x) = \begin{cases}
0, & \text{if }x =0 \\
x \sin(1/x), & \text{if } x \neq 0
\end{cases}$$
  on a finite interval containing the origin.

The following functions are absolutely continuous but not α-Hölder continuous:

- The function f(x) = x^{β} on [0, c], for any 0 < β < α < 1

The following functions are absolutely continuous and α-Hölder continuous but not Lipschitz continuous:

- The function f(x) = √x on [0, c], for α ≤ 1/2.

=== Generalizations ===
Let (X, d) be a metric space and let I be an interval in the real line R. A function f: I → X is absolutely continuous on I if for every positive number $\varepsilon$, there is a positive number $\delta$ such that whenever a finite sequence of pairwise disjoint sub-intervals [x_{k}, y_{k}] of I satisfies:

$$\sum_{k} \left| y_k - x_k \right| < \delta$$

then:

$$\sum_{k} d \left( f(y_k), f(x_k) \right) < \varepsilon.$$

The collection of all absolutely continuous functions from I into X is denoted AC(I; X).

A further generalization is the space AC^{p}(I; X) of curves f: I → X such that:

$$d \left( f(s), f(t) \right) \leq \int_s^t m(\tau) \,d\tau \text{ for all } [s, t] \subseteq I$$

for some m in the L^{p} space L^{p}(I).

=== Properties of these generalizations ===
- Every absolutely continuous function (over a compact interval) is uniformly continuous and, therefore, continuous. Every Lipschitz-continuous function is absolutely continuous.
- If f: [a,b] → X is absolutely continuous, then it is of bounded variation on [a,b].
- For f ∈ AC^{p}(I; X), the metric derivative of f exists for λ-almost all times in I, and the metric derivative is the smallest m ∈ L^{p}(I; R) such that:
  $$d \left( f(s), f(t) \right) \leq \int_s^t m(\tau) \,d\tau \text{ for all } [s, t] \subseteq I.$$

== Absolute continuity of measures ==
=== Definition ===
A measure $\mu$ on Borel subsets of the real line is absolutely continuous with respect to the Lebesgue measure $\lambda$ if for every Borel set $A,$ $\lambda(A) = 0$ implies $\mu(A) = 0$. Equivalently, $\mu(A) > 0$ implies $\lambda(A) > 0$. This condition is written as $\mu \ll \lambda.$ We say $\mu$ is dominated by $\lambda.$

In most applications, if a measure on the real line is simply said to be absolutely continuous — without specifying with respect to which other measure it is absolutely continuous — then absolute continuity with respect to the Lebesgue measure is meant.

The same principle holds for measures on Borel subsets of $\mathbb{R}^n, n \geq 2.$

=== Equivalent definitions ===
The following conditions on a finite measure $\mu$ on Borel subsets of the real line are equivalent:

1. $\mu$ is absolutely continuous;
2. For every positive number $\varepsilon$ there is a positive number $\delta > 0$ such that $\mu(A) < \varepsilon$ for all Borel sets $A$ of Lebesgue measure less than $\delta;$
3. There exists a Lebesgue integrable function $g$ on the real line such that:
  $$\mu(A) = \int_A g \,d\lambda$$
  for all Borel subsets $A$ of the real line.

For an equivalent definition in terms of functions see the section Relation between the two notions of absolute continuity.

Any other function satisfying (3) is equal to $g$ almost everywhere. Such a function is called Radon–Nikodym derivative, or density, of the absolutely continuous measure $\mu.$

Equivalence between (1), (2) and (3) holds also in $\R^n$ for all $n\in\mathbb{N}.$

Thus, the absolutely continuous measures on $\R^n$ are precisely those that have densities; as a special case, the absolutely continuous probability measures are precisely the ones that have probability density functions.

=== Generalizations ===
If $\mu$ and $\nu$ are two measures on the same measurable space $(X, \mathcal{A}),$ $\mu$ is said to be absolutely continuous with respect to $\nu$ if $\mu(A) = 0$ for every set $A$ for which $\nu(A) = 0.$ This is written as "$\mu\ll\nu$". That is:
$$\mu \ll \nu \qquad \text{ if and only if } \qquad \text{ for all } A\in\mathcal{A}, \quad (\nu(A) = 0\ \text{ implies } \ \mu (A) = 0).$$

When $\mu\ll\nu,$ then $\nu$ is said to be dominating $\mu.$

Absolute continuity of measures is reflexive and transitive, but is not antisymmetric, so it is a preorder rather than a partial order. Instead, if $\mu \ll \nu$ and $\nu \ll \mu,$ the measures $\mu$ and $\nu$ are said to be equivalent. Thus absolute continuity induces a partial ordering of such equivalence classes.

If $\mu$ is a signed or complex measure, it is said that $\mu$ is absolutely continuous with respect to $\nu$ if its variation $|\mu|$ satisfies $|\mu| \ll \nu;$ equivalently, if every set $A$ for which $\nu(A) = 0$ is $\mu$-null.

The Radon–Nikodym theorem states that if $\mu$ is absolutely continuous with respect to $\nu,$ and both measures are σ-finite, then $\mu$ has a density, or "Radon-Nikodym derivative", with respect to $\nu,$ which means that there exists a $\nu$-measurable function $f$ taking values in $[0, +\infty),$ denoted by $f = d\mu / d\nu,$ such that for any $\nu$-measurable set $A$ we have:
$$\mu(A) = \int_A f \,d\nu.$$

=== Singular measures ===
Via Lebesgue's decomposition theorem, every σ-finite measure can be decomposed into the sum of an absolutely continuous measure and a singular measure with respect to another σ-finite measure. See singular measure for examples of measures that are not absolutely continuous.

== Relation between the two notions of absolute continuity ==
A finite measure μ on Borel subsets of the real line is absolutely continuous with respect to Lebesgue measure if and only if the point function:

$$F(x)=\mu((-\infty,x])$$

is an absolutely continuous real function. More generally, a function has a locally (meaning on every bounded interval) absolutely continuous representative almost everywhere if and only if its distributional derivative is a measure that is absolutely continuous with respect to the Lebesgue measure.

If absolute continuity holds then the Radon–Nikodym derivative of μ is equal almost everywhere to the derivative of F.

More generally, the measure μ is assumed to be locally finite (rather than finite) and F(x) is defined as μ((0,x]) for x > 0, 0 for x = 0, and −μ((x,0]) for x < 0. In this case μ is the Lebesgue–Stieltjes measure generated by F. The relation between the two notions of absolute continuity still holds.
