= Minlos–Sazonov theorem =

The Minlos–Sasonov theorem is a result from measure theory in topological vector spaces. It provides a sufficient condition for a cylindrical measure to be σ-additive on a locally convex space. This is the case when its Fourier transform is continuous at zero in the Sazonov topology and such a topology is called sufficient. The theorem is named after the two Russian mathematicians Robert Adol'fovich Minlos and Vyacheslav Vasilievich Sazonov.

The theorem generalizes two classical theorem: the Minlos theorem (1963) and the Sazonov theorem (1958). It was then later generalized in the 1970s by the mathematicians Albert Badrikian and Laurent Schwartz to locally convex spaces. Therefore, the theorem is sometimes also called Minlos-Sasonov-Badrikian theorem.

== Minlos–Sasonov theorem ==
Let $(X,\tau)$ be a locally convex space, $X^*$ and $X'$ are the corresponding algebraic and topological dual spaces, and $\langle,\rangle:X\times X'\to \mathbb{R}$ is the dual pair. A topology $\tau^K$ on $X$ is called compatible with the dual pair $\langle,\rangle$ if the corresponding topological dual space induced by $\tau^K$ is again $X'$. A seminorm $p$ on $X$ is called Hilbertian or a Hilbert seminorm if there exists a positive definite bilinear form $b\colon X\times X\to\mathbb{R}$ such that $p(x)=\sqrt{b(x,x)}$ for all $x\in X$.

Let $\mathfrak{A}:=\mathfrak{A}(X,X'):=\bigotimes\limits_{n=1}^{\infty}\mathfrak{A}_{f_1,\dots,f_n}$ denote the cylindrical algebra.

=== Deriving the Sazonov topology ===
Let $p$ be a seminorm on $X$ and $X_{p}$ be the factor space $X_{p}:=X/p^{-1}(0)$ with canonical mapping $Q_{p}:X\to X_{p}$ defined as $Q_{p}:x\mapsto [x]$. Let $\overline{p}$ be the norm

$$\overline{p}(y)=p\left(Q^{-1}_{p}(y)\right)$$

on $X_{p}$, denote the corresponding Banach space as $\overline{X}_{p}$ and let $i_{p}:X_p\hookrightarrow \overline{X}_p$ be the natural embedding, then define the continuous map

$$\overline{Q}_p(x):=i_p\left(Q_{p}(x)\right)$$

which is a map $\overline{Q}_p:X\to \overline{X}_p$. Let $q$ be a seminorm such that for all $x\in X$

$$p(x)\leq C q(x),$$

then define a continuous linear operator $T_{q,p}: \overline{X}_{q}\to \overline{X}_{p}$ as follows:

- If $z\in i_q(X_q)\subseteq \overline{X}_q$ then $T_{q,p}(z):=\overline{Q}_p\left(\overline{Q}^{-1}_q(z)\right)$, which is well-defined.
- If $z\not\in i_q(X_q)$ and $z\in \overline{X}_q$, then there exists a sequence $(z_n)_n\in i_q(X_q)$ which converges against $z$ and the sequence $\left(T_{q,p}(z_n)\right)_n$ converges in $\overline{X}_p$ therefore $T_{q,p}(z):=\lim\limits_{n\to \infty}\left(T_{q,p}(z_n)\right)_n.$

If $p$ it Hilbertian then $\overline{X}_p$ is a Hilbert space.

=== Sazonov topology ===
Let $\mathcal{P}$ be a family of continuous Hilbert seminorms defined as follows: $p\in \mathcal{P}$ if and only if there exists a Hilbert seminorm $q$ such that for all $x\in X$

$$p(x)\leq C q(x)$$

for some constant $C\in \mathbb{R}$ and if $T_{q,p}$ is a Hilbert-Schmidt operator. Then the topology $\tau^S:=\tau^S(X,\tau)$ induced by the family $\mathcal{P}$ is called the Sazonov topology or S-topology. Clearly it depends on the underlying topology $\tau$. If $(X,\tau)$ is a nuclear then $\tau^S=\tau$.

=== Statement of the theorem ===
Let $\mu$ be a cylindrical measure on $\mathfrak{A}$ and $\tau$ a locally convex topology that is compatible with the dual pair and let $\tau^S:=\tau^S(X,\tau)$ be the Sazonov topology. Then $\mu$ is σ-additive on $\mathfrak{A}$ if the Fourier transform $\hat{\mu}(f):X'\to \mathbb{C}$ is continuous in zero in $\tau^S$.

== Bibliography ==
- Schwartz, Laurent (1973). Radon measures on arbitrary topological spaces and cylindrical measures. Tata Institute of Fundamental Research Studies in Mathematics.
- Bogachev, Vladimir I.; Smolyanov, Oleg G. (2017). Topological Vector Spaces and Their Applications. Springer Cham.
