= Tourism in Savoie =

Tourism industry in the Savoie region of France

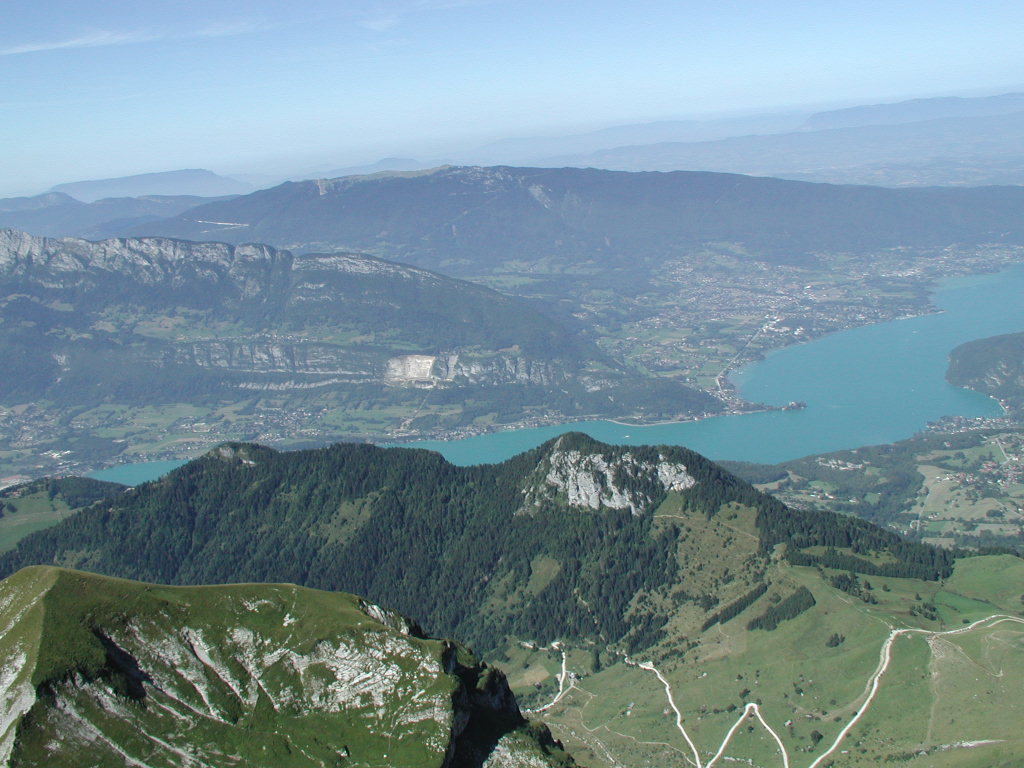
The shores of Lake Annecy as seen from the summit of La Tournette.

The Savoie region, which encompasses the French departments of Savoie and Haute-Savoie, has a thriving tourism industry. The Savoie Mont Blanc brand represents the region in this sector.

The tourism industry first emerged in the 18th century, initially centered around the appeal of thermal springs, followed by mountains and landscapes. Since the 1970s, the winter season has been the region's primary focus, with 60% of France's tourism coming to the region's hundred or so winter sports resorts. However, the region's other assets include a rich past, with historical sites found in cities and remote valleys alike, numerous lakes (Annecy; Bourget; Léman; Aiguebelette), and a wide range of sporting activities (water sports, mountain sports, aerial sports).

== History ==
=== Birth of tourism ===
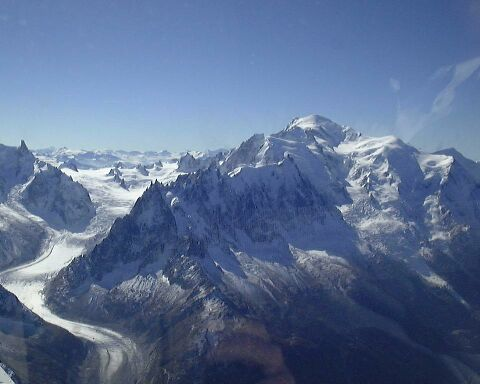
Panoramic view of the north side of the Mont Blanc massif from left to right: Dent du Géant, Mer de Glace, Aiguilles de Chamonix, Mont Blanc, Dôme du Goûter and Aiguille du Goûter.

The geographer Jean Miège underlines the significance of water as the primary asset and driving force behind the emergence of tourism in the former duchy of Savoy. Despite the Romans' early utilization of these resources, their potential was overlooked in subsequent centuries. However, the 16th and 17th centuries saw a fascinating rediscovery of these resources. Initially, water was extracted from the shores of the Alpine lakes of Le Bourget and Léman, then transported more profoundly into the intra-Alpine valleys of Faucigny and Tarentaise.

Many prominent authors have made use of the landscape in their descriptions. Notable figures referenced in the region include Montaigne, Montesquieu, Hugo, Dumas, Lamartine, Rousseau, Byron, and Shelley. From the 18th century onwards, Savoy became a popular destination for the Grand Tour of English aristocrats, a phenomenon traced back to Joseph Addison (1672-1719). A statesman, poet, and the founder of literary journalism, Addison was also a friend of Prince Eugène de Savoie-Carignan. In 1699, he embarked on a three-year tour of Europe, which undoubtedly inspired the Grand Tour. In particular, he visited the shores of Lake Geneva, which he described in detail and enthusiastically in his account, "Remarks on Several Parts of Italy". He was the driving force behind the trend of the Grand Tour among young Englishmen, a practice that young Americans later adopted. However, his assessment of the Savoyard shore of the Chablais region lake is that it is a place where there is "nothing but misery and poverty."

In 1741, William Windham (1697-1761) and Richard Pococke (1704-1765) discovered the Chamouni glaciers. Their accounts were disseminated through the salons of London and Paris. The Arve Valley and Chamonix, in particular, became the flagship destination for this nascent tourist industry. Despite the mountainous setting, the main attraction was the "glacières de Savoye", and more specifically the "glacières de Chamonix". It wasn't until 1786, however, that Chamonix became the mountaineering capital of the world, with the first ascent of Mont Blanc by Chamonix guide Jacques Balmat and his team.

Apart from this passage to the very heart of the Alps, tourism remained limited to the valley bottoms and mainly to the lakeside towns and villages around Lake Geneva (Geneva, Yvoire, Excenevex, Sciez, Thonon-les-Bains, Évian-les-Bains, Meillerie, Saint-Gingolph), Le Bourget (Aix-les-Bains) and Annecy. The development of lake tourism, including activities such as strolls along the shore or by boat, began in the 1830s. As time passed, tourists began to venture closer to the peaks, coinciding with the region's mountaineering development, particularly after 1850. The appeal of the mountains prompted the growth of towns such as Chamonix, Brides, Salins, and Pralognan. In the 18th century, the spa town of Aix-les-Bains boasted eighteen hotels and guesthouses, while Chamonix had less than a dozen. In 1895, these various resorts on the plains or at the bottom of the valley welcomed approximately 100,000 customers. Following the installation of the Montenvers railroad in 1908 and the Mont-Blanc tramway in 1912, efforts were made to attract tourists other than those engaged in sports activities. It was in the late 1950s that mass tourism reached the Savoyard valleys, including the summits.

=== Thermal baths ===
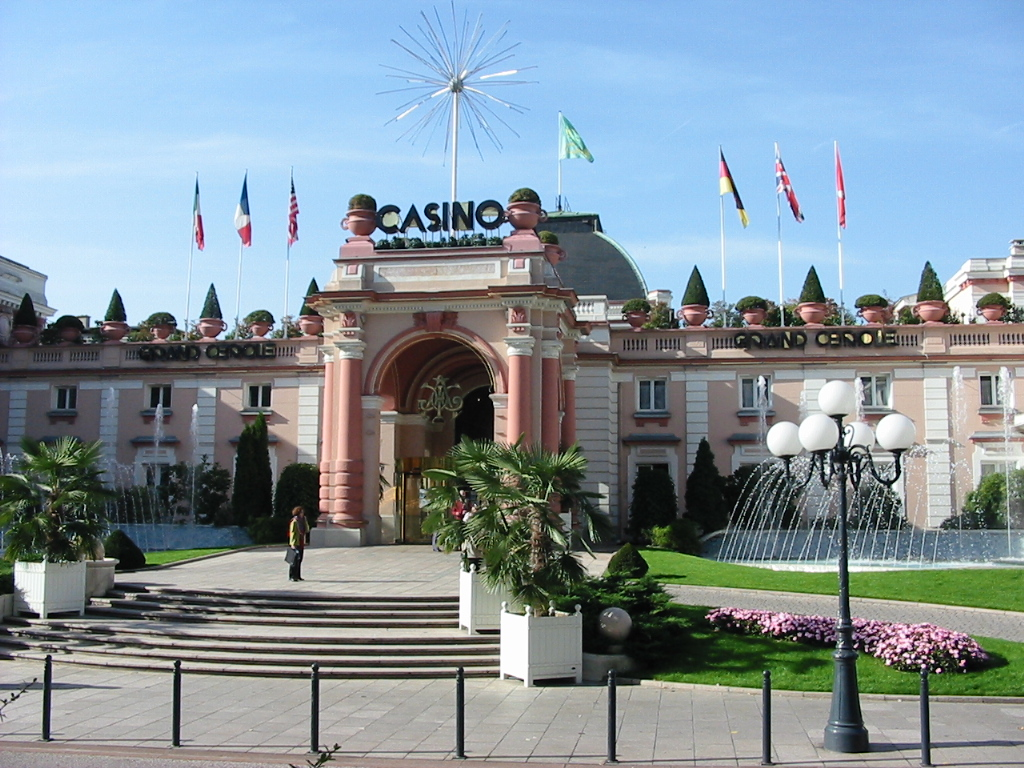
Entrance to the Grand-Cercle casino in Aix-les-Bains

The spa phenomenon benefited from the medicalization of the late 20th century, which enabled Savoie to develop its potential. The spa towns offered a range of activities that combined relaxation with discovering the mountain environment, appealing to the European elite. The number of visitors to Aix-les-Bains' thermal baths began to increase in 1876, following the opening of the rail link to France (1858) and, most notably, the Fréjus rail tunnel in 1871, which connected Aix-les-Bains to Italy. In 1895, an estimated 100,000 tourists availed themselves of the therapeutic waters. Initially, the towns situated in the Pre-Alps region benefited from these first visits.

The promotion of the various sites was mainly due to the patronage of the European aristocracy. Aix-les-Bains was honored by the visits of Queen Victoria (1886, 1890), Emperor Pedro II of Alcantara of Brazil (1888), George I of Greece (1889-1912), Wilhelmina of the Netherlands (1896), and Leopold of Belgium. In 1865, Évian-les-Bains was granted permission to use the name "les Bains", formalizing a practice that had emerged a few decades earlier in connection with the development of transportation. Thonon-les-Bains also saw a boost from this trend, as did the smaller resort of Challes-les-Eaux on the outskirts of Chambéry. Subsequently, spa visitors became more forthcoming as they explored towns inland closer to the mountains. Saint-Gervais-les-Bains, on the road to Chamonix and Mont Blanc, was the first to benefit from these tourists. Saint-Gervais-les-Bains has been a developing destination since 1806 when notary Joseph-Marie Gontard discovered the springs. The Tarentaise Valley also boasts several other sites, including Brides-les-Bains (established in 1819), Salins-les-Thermes, and La Léchère (which opened its first establishment in 1897).

These towns rapidly developed their infrastructure, including theaters and casinos, to attract the European elite. For instance, the Evian-les-Bains casino, designed by architect Ernest Hébrard, prompted J.-M. Marquis to describe it as "a perplexing reproduction of Constantinople's Sainte-Sophie [...] the lavish expanded structure of its dome, with its ribs accentuated by garlands of foliage, evokes the grandeur of a Byzantium adapted to the freshness of Lake Geneva."

=== Winter sports ===
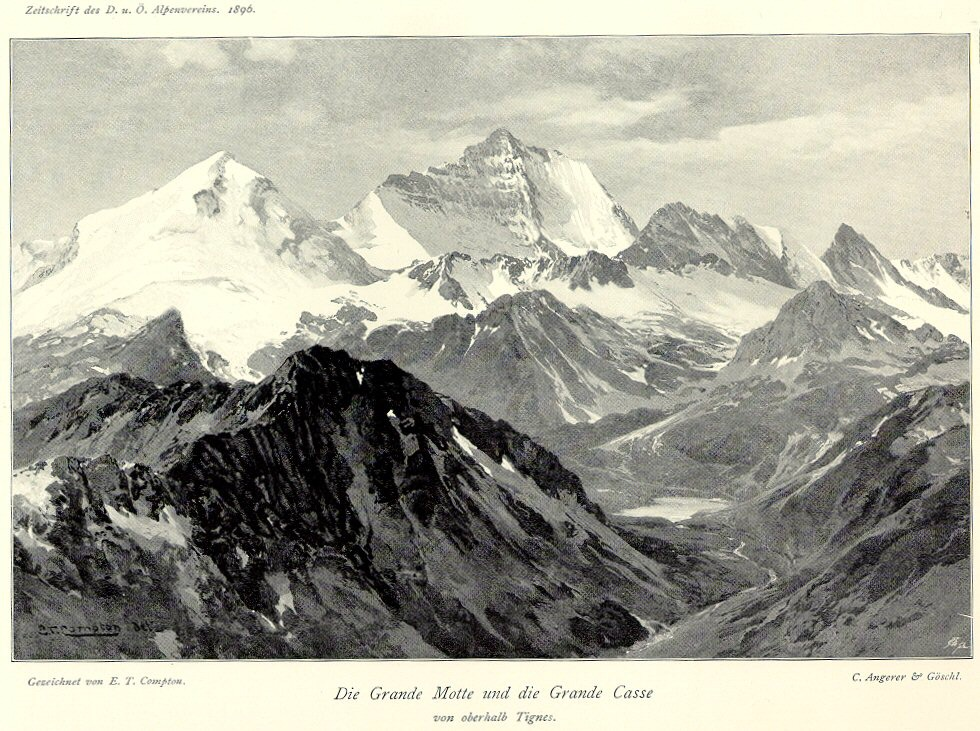
La Vanoise before the development of tourism, from the village of Tignes (postcard 1896).

Alpine tourism originated from the mountaineering movement in Chamonix at the end of the 19th century. Several hotel chalets were constructed, including the Col de la Vanoise, inaugurated by Félix Faure in 1897. Additionally, several refuges were built, such as the Vallot observatory, which was associated with a shelter in 1892, and the Grands Mulets hut, which was completed in 1897. The actual surge in winter tourism commenced with the advent of skiing. The presence of slopes and snow does not guarantee the existence of a skiing industry. As with any social phenomenon, the development of skiing was dependent on the actions of a few external or local players. The railroads and spa resorts have ensured a steady stream of tourists. The development of skiing in the late 1880s and the creation of the first ski slopes in the Alps (Saint-Moritz in Switzerland) led to the development of the first ski resorts based in villages such as Chamonix, Megève (a resort launched by a sports journalist and Baroness Noémie de Rothschild in 1921) and Pralognan-la-Vanoise.

The inaugural Winter Olympics were held in Chamonix in 1924, although downhill skiing still needed to be featured. However, the first winter resorts were already emerging. The development of Savoyard Resorts unfolded in four distinct phases, each marked by the significant involvement of different entities: local entrepreneurs, the state, or private developers. This underscores the crucial role played by these stakeholders in shaping the Alpine tourism landscape. Local authorities recognized the potential of the new winter tourism boom and regional authorities initiated programs to develop new ski resorts at higher altitudes (1,600-1,800 m). These are referred to as second-generation resorts. In 1945, the Savoie General Council initiated the Courchevel 1800 project in the commune of Saint-Bon-Tarentaise. It was based on a report launched by the Vichy government in 1943. The departmental road leads to the departmental chalet, to which hotels and chalets are added without accurate urban planning. Courchevel is the only example in Savoie. Chamrousse and L'Alpe d'Huez, in neighboring Isère, are other French examples.

Example of ski resorts in Savoie

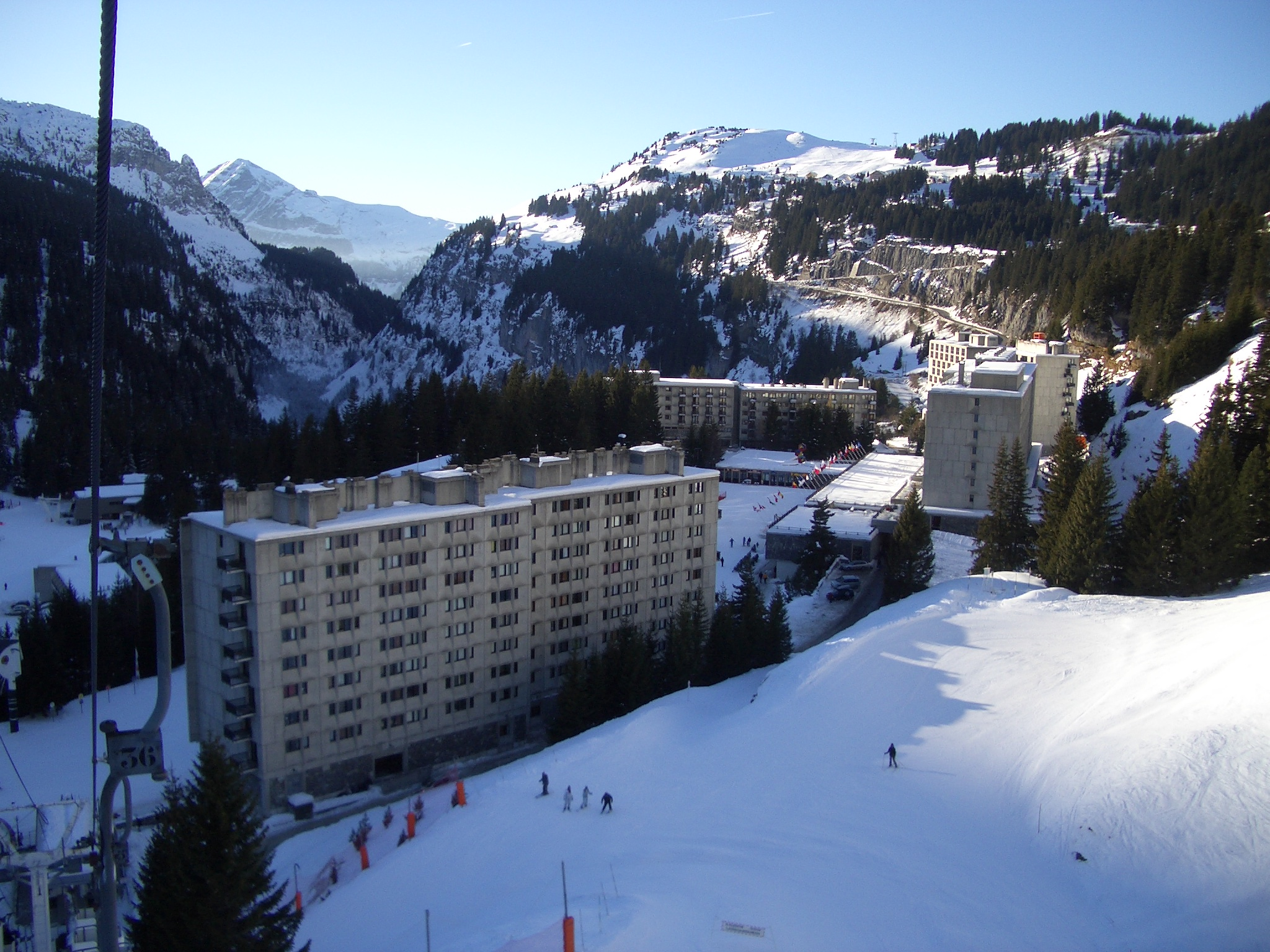
Flaine station

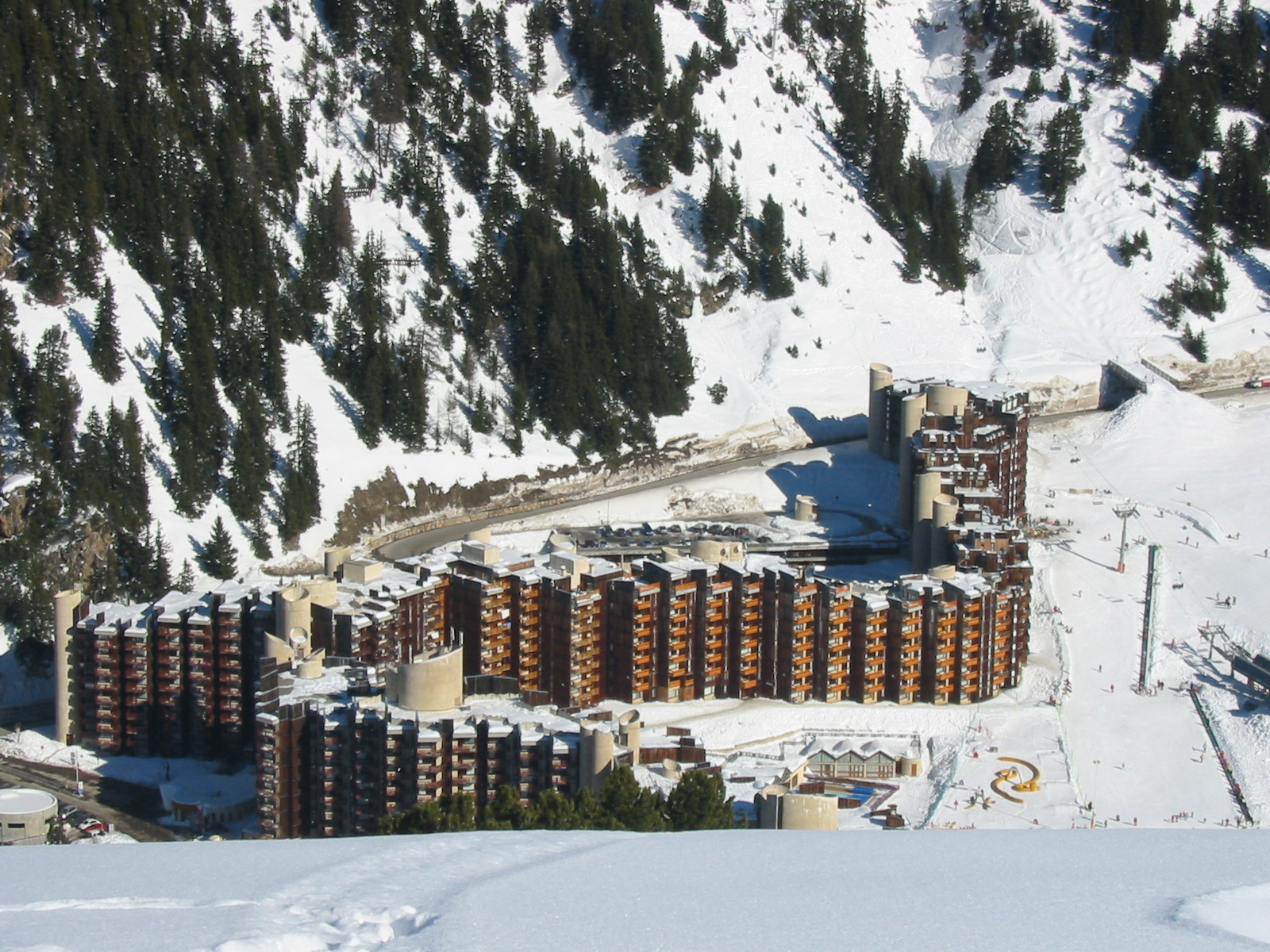
La Plagne Bellecôte Village, La Plagne.

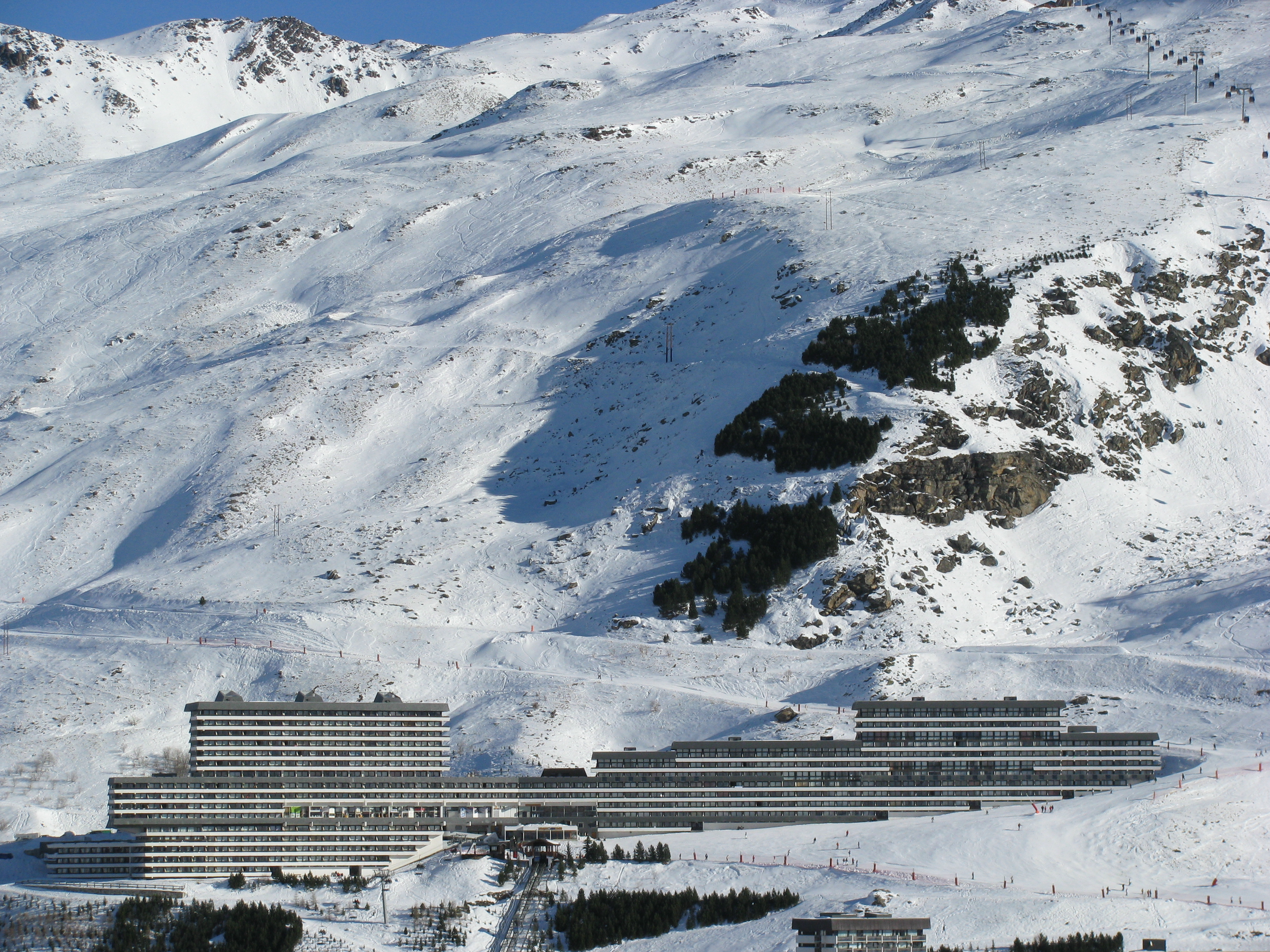
Brelin building, Les Menuires.

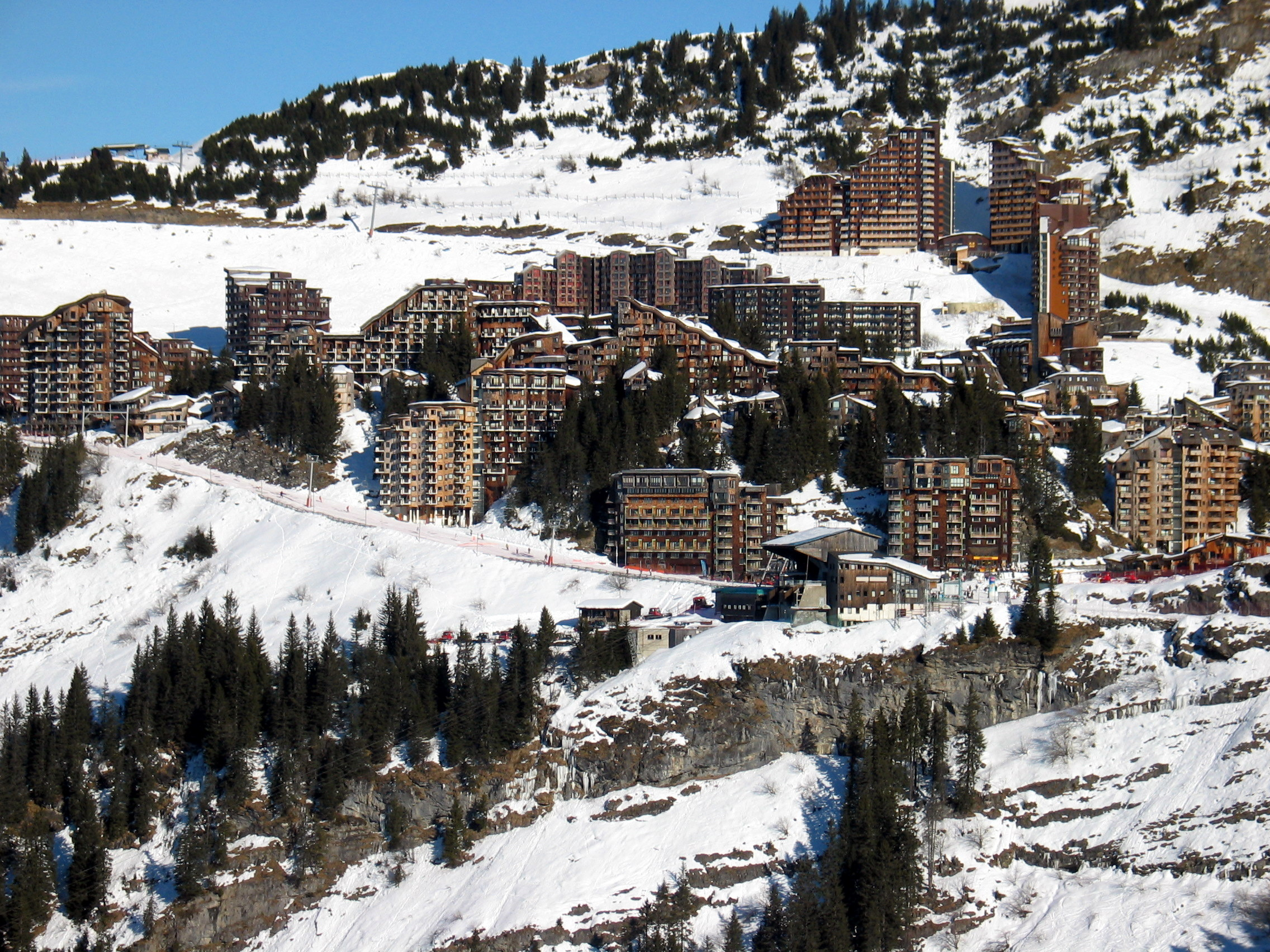
Avoriaz station

From 1975 onward, a new concept emerged in the resort industry: the so-called 4th-generation or "village resorts." While not a homogenous group, these villages were created from scratch or built around existing towns. They emphasized traditional uses and complemented existing activities while striving to integrate better into the surrounding area and restore the human dimension. Examples from Savoie include Montchavin (1972), Valmorel (1975), Les Karellis, and Bonneval-sur-Arc.

== Economy ==
=== Promoting the region ===
The two Savoyard departments collaborate to promote their shared territory. As early as the 1930s, the Comité Regional Savoie-Mont-Blanc, based in Aix-les-Bains, established a Maison de Savoie in Paris. The premises were inaugurated on Avenue des Champs-Élysées on May 12, 1934.

The two departmental tourism agencies work together to promote the Savoie region and the "Savoie Haute-Savoie" brand under the impetus of the Assemblée des Pays de Savoie (APS), created in 2001. The agreement between the two agencies involved the dissolution of the Maison de Savoie in Paris and the implementation of a new marketing strategy by forming a new association under the French law of 1901. Following a study carried out in 2005, the choice was made to adopt the Savoie Mont Blanc and Savoie Mont Blanc Tourisme (SMBT) structure as the destination brand for the region. The APS approved the plan on March 27 of the following year. The two vice-presidents of the General Councils of the two departments in charge of tourism assume the role of presidents of the Savoie Mont Blanc Tourisme Association. The new brand was launched in the last quarter of 2006. Operating budgets are estimated at €1.7 million and €4 million for communications for the first two years. The brand is headquartered on Avenue du Parmelan in Annecy. However, the structure is completed by two other reception areas in Chambéry and Paris, at 20 rue Croix-des-Petits-Champs (1st arrondissement).

Local heritage is also promoted around the Association des Guides du Patrimoine des Pays de Savoie, which divides the region into six tourist areas based on provincial boundaries. These are: to the north, in Haute-Savoie, the French Chablais with Lake Geneva and the Chablais massif; the Faucigny with the Arve Valley; the Genevois with Lake Annecy; and to the south, in Savoie, the Savoie Propre with the Savoyard Avant-Pays, Lac du Bourget and Combe de Savoie; and the Maurienne and Tarentaise Art and History regions. The region encompasses the Mont-Blanc and Giffre valleys, the Genevois with Lake Annecy, and the Savoie Propre with the Savoyard Avant-Pays, Lac du Bourget, and Combe de Savoie, as well as the Maurienne and Tarentaise Art and History regions, all of which are located to the south. The group of Savoie guides was initially known as "Guides de Conflans", established in 1964 by Abbé Marius Hudry. The name was subsequently changed to "Guides du Patrimoine des Pays de Savoie" in 1985.

=== Tourism in numbers ===
Savoie's accommodation capacity makes it one of France's most popular tourist regions, offering various accommodation options to suit different needs and budgets. In 2015, this Alps region had a gross capacity of over one million beds (including second homes), with 80% in the mountains. The figures are as follows: over 300,000 in Tarentaise, 200,000 in the Mont-Blanc region, over 100,000 in Haut-Chablais and Maurienne, and 70,000 in Giffre and on the shores of Lake Geneva.

Evolution of winter nights in Savoie, since 1994 (in millions)
Winter 94-95	Winter 95-96	Winter 96-97	Winter 97-98	Winter 98-99	Winter 99-00	Winter 00-01	Winter 01-02	Winter 02-03	Winter 03-04
38,8	36	36,5	39	37,6	38	39,5	38,2	39,5	39,3

Winter 04-05	Winter 05-06	Winter 06-07	Winter 07-08	Winter 08-09	Winter 09-10	Winter 10-11	Winter 11-12	Winter 12-13	Winter 13-14
38,5	38,3	37,5	39	38,3	38,3	38,3	39,5	40,1	39,1

Winter 14-15	Winter 15-16	Winter 16-17	Winter 17-18
39,4	39,9	39,1	39,9
Source: Savoie-Mont-Blanc Tourism Observatory

Evolution of summer nights in Savoie, since 1998 (in millions)
Summer 98	Summer 99	Summer 00	Summer 01	Summer 02	Summer 03	Summer 04	Summer 05	Summer 06	Summer 07
24,7	24,3	24,9	25	24,7	25,5	24,6	23,5	23,4	22,7
Summer 08	Summer 09	Summer 10	Summer 11	Summer 12	Summer 13	Summer 14	Summer 15	Summer 16	Summer 17
22,1	22,6	22,7	22,4	22,3	22,1	21,4	21,9	22,0	22,4
Source: Savoie-Mont-Blanc Tourism Observatory

The figures show that summer visitor numbers in Haute-Savoie are approximately 70% higher than those in Savoie. In the winter season, the ratio is reversed, particularly in the Tarentaise Valley and its major ski areas of Les Trois Vallées, La Plagne, Les Arcs, and Espace Killy (Tignes: 1.5 million overnight stays).

Tourism is a significant economic driver, contributing approximately 4.5 billion euros to the region's wealth, which is 50% of the department's total (2001). This thriving industry also accounts for 28% of the department's workforce, a significant portion of which is due to the development of winter tourism. In Haute-Savoie, this sector employs 12% of the workforce, reflecting the region's robust economic diversity compared to its neighbor. The 2012-2013 winter season saw overnight stays exceed 40 million.

In 2016, the tourism sector was estimated to have created 46,655 jobs in the region: 23 774 in Savoie and 22 881 in Haute-Savoie. It is estimated that spin-offs from ski areas are worth 5.8 billion euros, representing 19% of the region's GDP. According to the CCI, the Savoie department accounts for 3.9 billion euros of this figure. Sales from ski areas in the department are estimated at €589 million (2014-2015 season), representing 45% of the results in this activity for France.

=== Tourist accommodations ===
In 2017, Savoie Mont Blanc reported a total capacity of 1,424,500 tourist beds across all communes in the two Savoie regions, distributed across 215,117 establishments. This figure was estimated in 2014 at 1,065,093 tourist beds for winter sports resorts, spread across 159,547 establishments. Notably, 80% of these beds are in the mountains. In 2008, tourist accommodation in Savoie represented 418,496 establishments, with an additional 8,370 tourist beds in non-approved market accommodation.

Accommodation for registered merchants, number of beds in 2017
Savoie	Haute-Savoie	
Hospitality industry	40 437 38 690	39 354 31 496
Camping	21 285 36 348	36 783 34 848
Shared accommodation	36 702 29 967	29 654 32 858
Mountain hut and lodges	5 673	5 464
Vacation rental	53 070 70 461	53 905 97 600
Cottages Gîtes de France / Clévacances	841	760
Apartment hotel	109 676 44 595	35 239 15 719
Observatory Savoie Mont Blanc (2017) Source: Observatoire du Tourisme Rhône-Alpes (2008).

== Tourist attractions ==
=== Environmental heritage ===
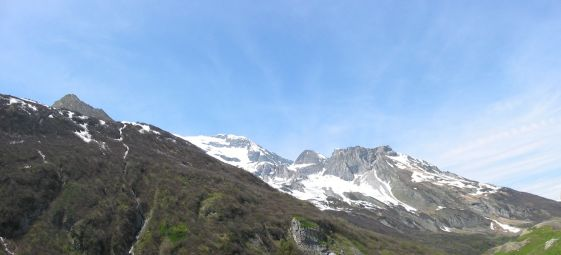
The Grand Bec seen from Champagny le Haut.

In 2011, the Parc Naturel du Massif des Bauges was awarded the Geopark label. In 2015, the Massif des Bauges and the Chablais region were awarded the new UNESCO Global Geopark label.

=== Touristic towns and villages ===
==== Certified towns and resorts ====
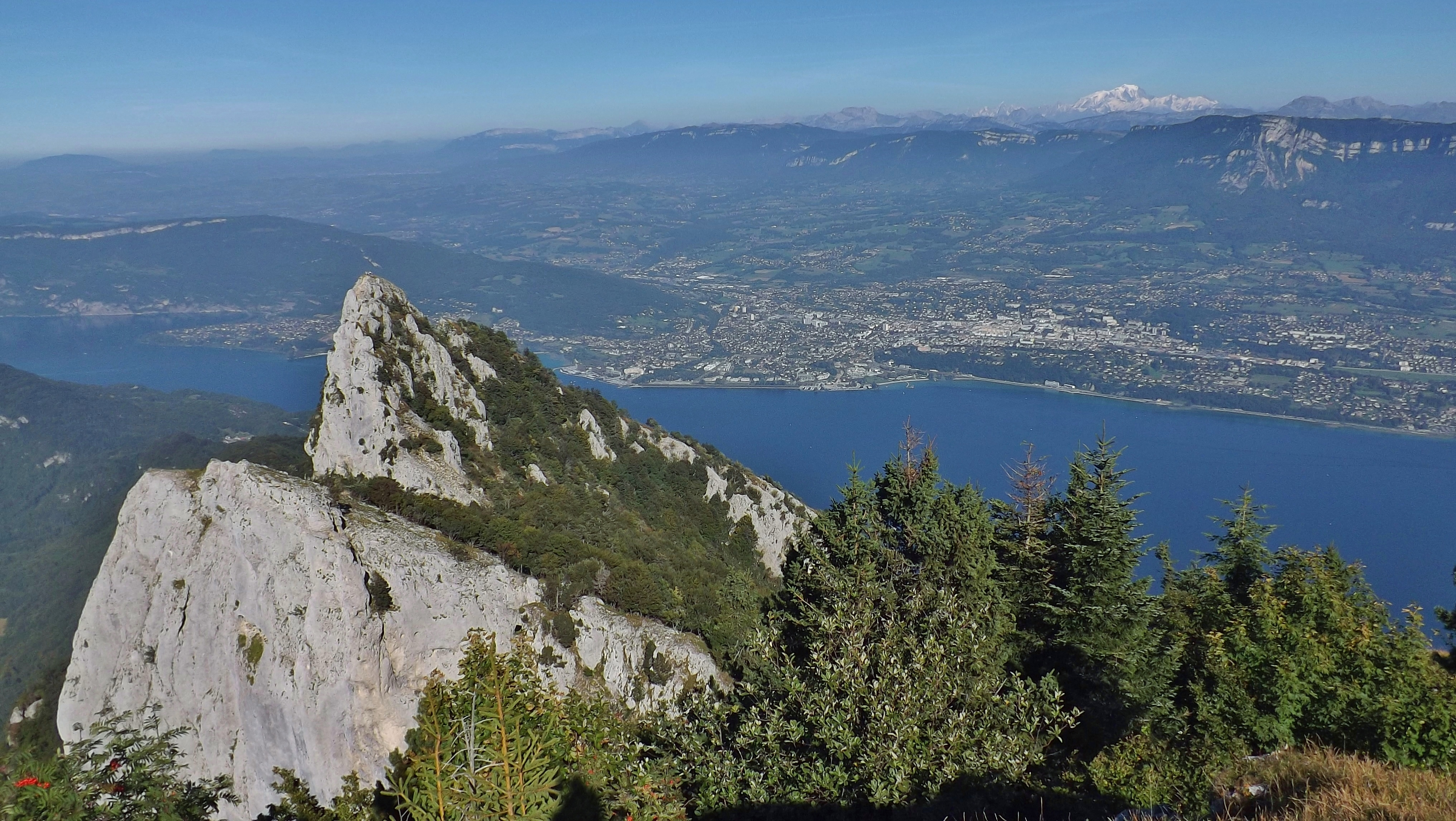
Lac du Bourget and Aix-les-Bains.

Several communes in Savoie have been granted the official "commune touristique" and even "station classée de tourisme" labels. The town of Aix-les-Bains (Savoie), situated on the shores of France's largest natural lake (Lac du Bourget) and the Massif des Bauges, was designated a direct tourist resort in September 2013 before obtaining the "commune touristique" label. Chambéry, the department's capital and former capital of the Dukes of Savoy, also received this designation.

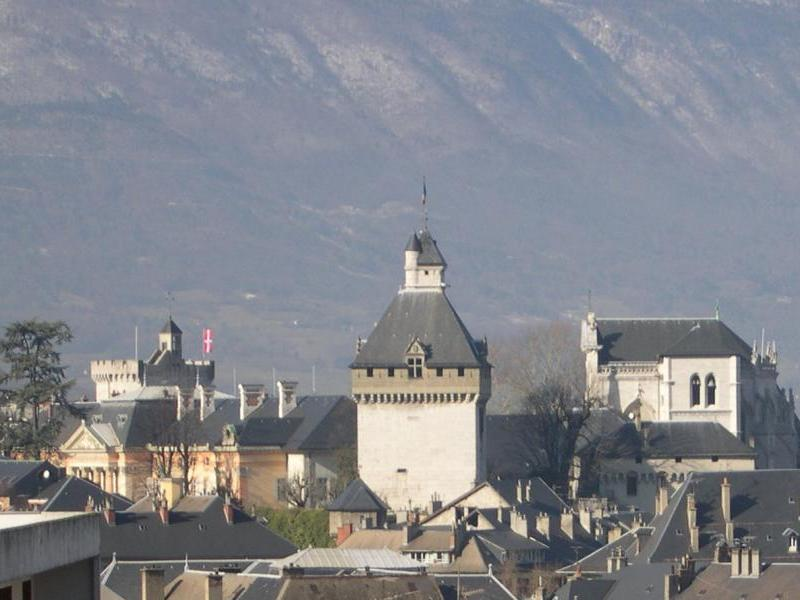
The castle of the Dukes of Savoy in Chambéry.

Many of the classified communes in the Savoie department are winter sports resorts. The communes belonging to the Grande Plagne area (La Plagne resort) – Aime, Bellentre, Champagny-en-Vanoise, and Mâcot-la-Plagne – have been classified, as have the communes of the Trois Vallées area – Les Allues. The communes of Méribel, Brides-les-Bains (also a spa resort), Saint-Martin-de-Belleville (Val Thorens, Les Menuires), La Perrière (La Tania), and Villarembert (Le Corbier) have also been classified.

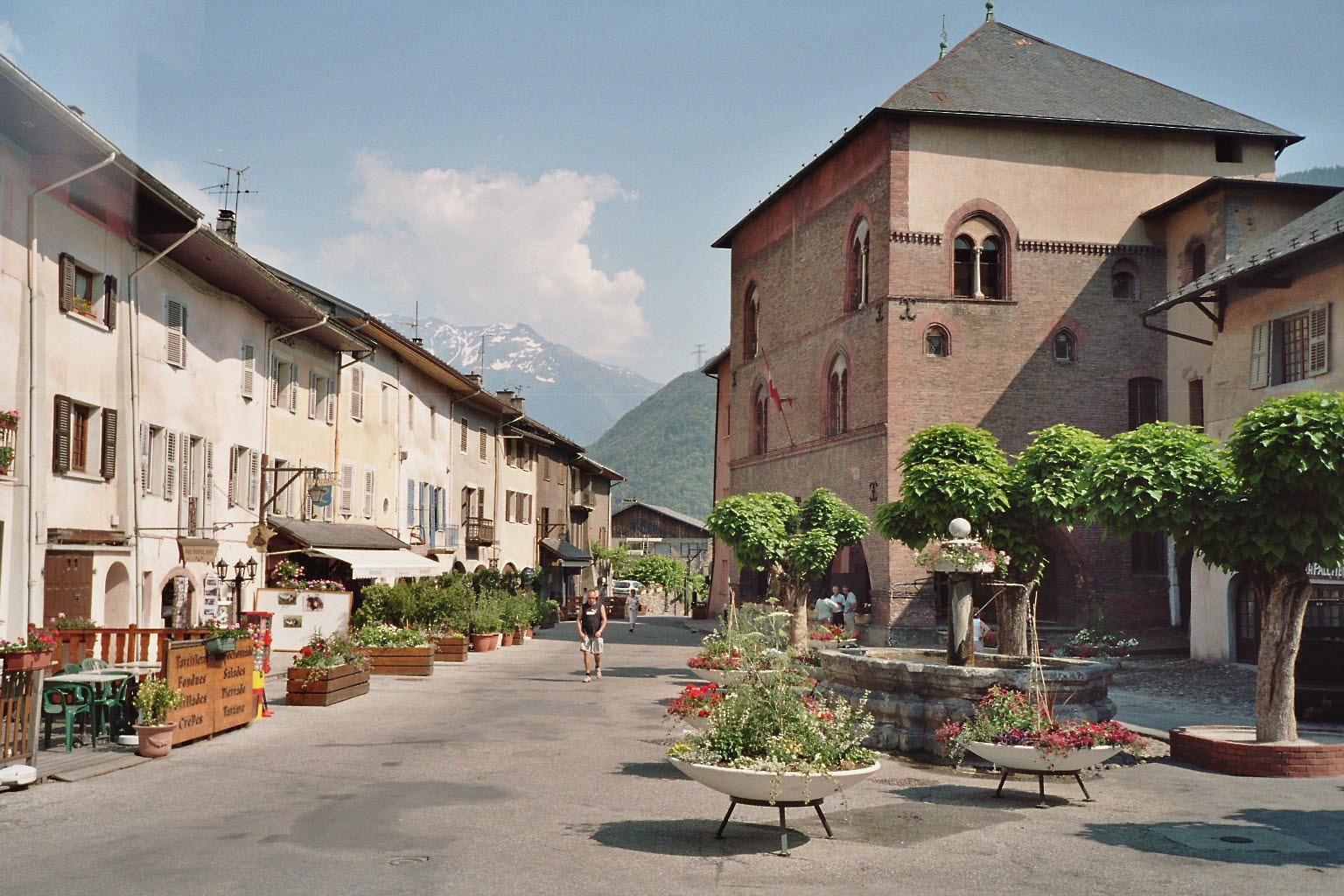
City of Conflans.

The French government has designated four Savoyard towns and two Savoyard provinces as "Villes et Pays d'art et d'histoire" (Cultural and Historical Towns and Regions). Savoie remains the most prosperous region, with the towns of Aix-les-Bains, Albertville-Conflans (2003) and Chambéry (1985), as well as the Pays des Hautes vallées de Savoie (1991), which encompasses the high valleys of Maurienne and Tarentaise, all meeting the criteria for the label. In Haute-Savoie, only Annecy and the Val d'Abondance, with the appellation Pays de la Vallée d'Abondance, in the province of Chablais, have been designated as "Villes et Pays d'art et d'histoire."

Savoie and Haute-Savoie are the holders of the Trophée National des Départements Fleuris, an award bestowed upon only 20 departments in France. In 2006, 53 communes were awarded the label, comprising 3 Four Flowers/Grand Prix, 13 Three Flowers, and 17 Two Flowers. In the department of Savoie, 33 communes were awarded the label, including one Grand Prix, two Quatre Fleurs, five Trois Fleurs, and nine Deux Fleurs. Five of the 197 French communes have been awarded four flowers and one Grand Prix: Annecy, Évian-les-Bains, Yvoire, and Aix-les-Bains. The village of Nances (population: 330) has just been awarded its fourth Fleur. The town of Aix-les-Bains was awarded the Fleur d'Or in 2012, the highest distinction for flowering.

=== Casinos ===
Savoie operates twelve casinos, primarily located in the Haute-Savoie region.

Gross product of the Casinos de Savoie (in thousands €)
Casinos	Communes	Group	2004-2005 (rank)	2005-2006 (rank)
Casino Grand-Cercle	Aix-les-Bains	Casino d'Aix-les-Bains	25,8 (24^{e})	26,2 (27^{e})
Nouveau Casino	Aix-les-Bains		4,2 (155^{e})	4 (157^{e})
Poker Bowl	Aix-les-Bains		–	–
Impérial Palace	Annecy		16,6 (52^{e})	17,2 (51^{e})
Casino d'Annemasse	Annemasse	Groupe Partouche	33,7 (15^{e})	34,2 (14^{e})
Casino de Brides-les-Bains	Brides-les-Bains		3,2 (166^{e})	3,2 (170^{e})
Casino de Challes-les-Eaux	Challes-les-Eaux		7,1 (110^{e})	7,1 (115^{e})
Casino de Chamonix	Chamonix-Mont-Blanc	Groupe Lucien Barrière	8,9 (90^{e})	9,4 (90^{e})
Casino d'Évian - Domaine du Royal Club Evian	Évian-les-Bains		29,6 (18^{e})	28 (20^{e})
Casino de Megève Mont-Blanc	Megève	Groupe Tahoe	5,8 (130^{e})	6,7 (121^{e})
Casino de Saint-Gervais-les-Bains	Saint-Gervais-les-Bains	Groupe Tranchant	4,8 (143^{e})	5,5 (137^{e})
Casino de Saint-Julien-en-Genevois	Saint-Julien-en-Genevois	Groupe Partouche	10,5 (81^{e})	12,3 (73^{e})

== Hotels & Restaurants ==
=== Listed restaurants ===
In 2017, Savoie received 51 stars (2/3 macaroons) for 32 restaurants in the Michelin Guide. The Savoie department has 54 macaroons, while Haute-Savoie has 42. There are five new-starred restaurants (four in Savoie and one in Haute-Savoie), including Yannick Alléno's three-star Le 1947 in Courchevel. The Courchevel resort holds the record with 14 macaroons shared between eight establishments.

In 2014, 33 establishments received two or three stars, with 19 in Savoie and 14 in Haute-Savoie. In the 2012 promotion, 31 restaurants in the Savoie region were awarded a Michelin star, with the Savoie department, which includes 19 classified establishments, receiving 27 stars.

Michelin Three-Stars Restaurants
Year	Chef	Establishment	Locality	Department
2012	Emmanuel Renault	Flocons de Sel	Megève	74 Haute-Savoie
2015	René Meilleur	La Bouitte	Saint-Martin-de-Belleville	73 Savoie
2017	Yannick Alléno & Denis Fétisson	Cheval Blanc Courchevel	Courchevel	73 Savoie

Michelin Two-Stars Restaurants
Year	Chef	Establishment	Locality	Department
2013	Nicolas Sale	La Table du Kilimandjaro	Courchevel	73 Savoie
2010	Pierre Gagnaire	Les Airelles	Courchevel 1850	73 Savoie
2017	Gatien Demczyna	Les Airelles	Courchevel 1850	73 Savoie
1984	Michel Rochedy & Stéphane Buron	Le Chabichou	Courchevel 1850	73 Savoie
2017	Nicolas Sale	Le Kintessence	Courchevel 1850	73 Savoie
2012	Jean-André Charial, Sylvestre et Jonathan Walid	Le Strato	Courchevel 1850	73 Savoie
2016	Pierre Maillet	Hameau Albert 1^{er}	Chamonix-Mont-Blanc	74 Haute-Savoie
2016	Julien Gatillon	Four Seasons Megève	Megève	74 Haute-Savoie
2013	Yoann Conte	Restaurant Yoann Conte	Annecy	74 Haute-Savoie
2007	Laurent Petit	Le Clos des Sens	Annecy-le-Vieux	74 Haute-Savoie
2017	Marc Veyrat	La Maison des Bois	Manigod	74 Haute-Savoie
2000	Jean-Pierre Jacob	Le Bateau Ivre	Le Bourget-du-Lac	73 Savoie
2012	Mickaël Arnoult	Auberge Les Morainières	Jongieux	73 Savoie
2015	Benoît Vidal	L'Atelier d'Edmond	Val-d'Isère	73 Savoie
2010	Jean Sulpice	L'Oxalys	Val Thorens	73 Savoie

=== Luxury hotels ===
There are numerous luxury hotels in Savoie, including:

- The Park Hôtel du Casino in Aix-les-Bains.
- The Hôtel Impérial Palace, which opened in 1913, features a casino in Annecy.
- La Maison de Marc Veyrat, Veyrier-du-Lac.
- Les Airelles, Courchevel.
- Le Byblos, Courchevel.
- The Evian Royal Resort, comprising the Evian Royal Palace and the Evian Royal Ermitage, was constructed in 1907 in Évian-les-Bains.
- Four Seasons Megève, located on the Domaine du Mont d'Arbois.

Additionally, there is a 5-star hotel with the palace label, the Cheval Blanc in Courchevel.

== Bibliography ==
- Préau, Pierre (1982). "Tourisme et urbanisation en montagne : le cas de la Savoie". Revue de Géographie Alpine (in French). 70: 137–151. doi:10.3406/rga.1982.2497.
- Miège, Jean (1933). "La vie touristique en Savoie". Revue de géographie alpine (in French). 21 (4): 749–817. doi:10.3406/rga.1933.5380.
- Delorme, Franck (2014). "L'Atelier d'architecture en montagne. Contribution à la mise au point d'une architecture de montagne". In Situ (in French) (24). Open Edition Journals. doi:10.4000/insitu.11198.
- Nicolas, Jean (2004). La Savoie au XVIIIe siècle : Noblesse et Bourgeoisie (in French) (2nd ed.). La Fontaine de Siloé. ISBN 978-2842062224.
- Guichonnet, Paul (1980). Histoire et civilisations des Alpes (in French). PRIVAT. ISBN 978-2708923720.
- Fournier, Alain (2005). Mer de glace : Montenvers (in French). La Fontaine De Siloe. ISBN 2842062620.
- Boyer, Marc (2005). Histoire générale du tourisme du XVIe siècle au XXIe siècle (in French). L'Harmattan. ISBN 9782747584326.
- Comby, Louis (1977). Histoire des Savoyards (in French). Nathan. ASIN B0000E8UIH.
- Edighoffer, Roland (1992). Histoire de la Savoie (in French). Presses Universitaires de France. ISBN 978-2130448389.
- Jamot, Christian (1988). Thermalisme et villes thermales en France (in French). Vol. 32. Institut d'études du Massif central. ISBN 9782877410441.
- Palluel-Guillard, André (1986). La Savoie de Révolution française à nos jours, XIXe – XXe siècle (in French). Ouest de la France. ISBN 2737300053.
- Leguay, Thérèse; Leguay, Jean-Pierre (2005). Histoire de la Savoie (in French). Editions Gisserot. ISBN 978-2877478120.
- Jarrassé, Dominique (1992). Les Thermes romantiques. Bains et villégiatures en France de 1800 à 1850 (in French). Presses Univ Blaise Pascal. ISBN 9782877410601.
- Jarrassé, Dominique (1996). Deux mille ans de thermalisme. Presses Univ Blaise Pascal. ISBN 9782877410700.
- Boyer, Marc (1955). "La vie touristique des Dorons de la Vanoise, son évolution récente". Géocarrefour (in French). 30 (2). Revue de géographie de Lyon: 103–135. doi:10.3406/geoca.1955.2014.
- Knaffou, Rémy (1978). Les Stations intégrées de sport d'hiver des Alpes françaises : l'aménagement de la montagne à la « française » (in French). Paris: Masson. ISBN 2-225-49412-6.
- Dreyfus-Signoles, Catherine (2002). L'espace touristique (in French). Editions Bréal. ISBN 9782842919078.
- Acloque-Desmulier, Delphine; Delpirou, Aurélien; Bonnet-Pineau, Elisabeth (2012). La France : Territoires et aménagement face à la mondialisation : Ouvrage numérique pdf (in French). NATHAN. ISBN 9782098124233.
- Raymond, Justinien (1983). La Haute-Savoie sous la IIIe République : histoire économique, sociale et politique, 1875-1940 (in French). Éd. du Champ vallon. ISBN 978-2-903528-25-6.
- Blanc-Eberhart, Claudie (2012). "Savoie Mont Blanc. La destination crée l'organisation touristique". Revue Espaces (in French).
- Germain, Michel (2007). Personnages illustres des Savoie : "de viris illustribus" (in French). Lyon. ISBN 978-2-915688-15-3.
- Richalet, Jean-Paul; Rathat, Christian; Larmignat, P. H. (1991). Pathologie et altitude (in French). Masson. ISBN 978-2225822254.

== See also ==
=== Related articles ===
- History of Savoy
- French Towns and Lands of Art and History

=== External links ===
- Savoie Mont-Blanc Tourisme
