= Measure theory in topological vector spaces =

Subject in mathematics

In mathematics, measure theory in topological vector spaces refers to the extension of measure theory to topological vector spaces. Such spaces are often infinite-dimensional, but many results of classical measure theory are formulated for finite-dimensional spaces and cannot be directly transferred. This is already evident in the case of the Lebesgue measure, which does not exist in general infinite-dimensional spaces. In fact, there is no nontrivial left-invariant Radon measure on any Hausdorff, non-locally compact topological group and infinite-dimensional vector spaces are not locally compact.

The article considers only topological vector spaces, which also possess the Hausdorff property. Vector spaces without topology are mathematically not that interesting because concepts such as convergence and continuity are not defined there.

== σ-Algebras ==
Let $(X,\mathcal{T})$ be a topological vector space, $X^*$ the algebraic dual space and $X'$ the topological dual space. In topological vector spaces there exist three prominent σ-algebras:

- the Borel σ-algebra $\mathcal{B}(X)$: is generated by the open sets of $\mathcal{T}$.
- the cylindrical σ-algebra $\mathcal{E}(X, X')$: is generated by the dual space $X'$.
- the Baire σ-algebra $\mathcal{B}_0(X)$: is generated by all continuous functions $C(X,\mathbb{R})$. The Baire σ-algebra is also notated $\mathcal{Ba}(X)$.

The following relationship holds:

$$\mathcal{E}(X,X')\subseteq \mathcal{B}_0(X)\subseteq \mathcal{B}(X)$$

where $\mathcal{E}(X,X')\subseteq \mathcal{B}_0(X)$ is obvious.

=== Cylindrical σ-algebra ===
Let $X$ and $Y$ be two vector spaces in duality. A set of the form

$$C_{f_1,\dots,f_n,B}:=\{x\in X\colon (\langle x,f_1\rangle,\dots,\langle x,f_n\rangle)\in B\}$$

for $B\in\mathcal{B}(\mathbb{R}^n)$ and $f_1,\dots,f_n\in Y$ is called a cylinder set and if $B$ is open, then it's an open cylinder set. The set of all cylinders is $\mathfrak{A}_{f_1,\dots,f_n}$ and the set of all open cylinders is $\mathfrak{A}^{O}_{f_1,\dots,f_n}$. If one takes the product $\otimes_{n\in \mathbb{N}} \mathfrak{A}_{f_1,\dots,f_n}$, this only produces an algebra. The σ-algebra

$$\mathcal{E}(X,Y)=\sigma\left(\mathcal{Zyl}(X,Y)\right)=\sigma\left(\bigotimes_{n\in \mathbb{N}} \mathfrak{A}_{f_1,\dots,f_n}\right)$$

is called the cylindrical σ-algebra. The sets of cylinders and the set of open cylinders generate the same cylindrical σ-algebra, i.e. $\sigma(\mathfrak{A}_{f_1,\dots,f_n})=\sigma(\mathfrak{A}^{O}_{f_1,\dots,f_n})$.

For the weak topology $T_s:=T_s(X,X')$ the cylindrical σ-algebra $\mathcal{E}(X,X')$ is the Baire σ-algebra of $(X,T_s)$. One uses the cylindrical σ-algebra because the Borel σ-algebra can lead to measurability problems in infinite-dimensional space. In connection with integrals of continuous functions it is difficult or even impossible to extend them to arbitrary borel sets. For non-separable spaces it can happen that the vector addition is no longer measurable to the product algebra of borel σ-algebras because in general $\mathcal{B}(X)\otimes \mathcal{B}(Y) \subset \mathcal{B}(X \times Y)$, however for the cylindrical σ-algebra one has $\mathcal{E}(X,X')\otimes \mathcal{E}(Y,Y') = \mathcal{E}(X\times Y,X'\times Y')$.

=== Equality of the σ-algebras ===
- Let $(X,\mathcal{T})$ be a topological vector space and let $T_s:=T_s(X,X')$ be the weak topology, then $\mathcal{E}(X,X')$ is exactly the Baire σ-algebra of $(X,T_s)$.
- Let $(X,\mathcal{T})$ be a separable, metrizable locally convex space and $T_s:=T_s(X,X')$ be the weak topology. Then $\mathcal{E}(X,X')$, $\mathcal{B}_0(X)$ and $\mathcal{B}(X)$ are equivalent under $\mathcal{T}$ and $T_s$.

== Measures ==
One way to construct a measure on an infinite-dimensional space is to first define the measure on finite-dimensional spaces and then extend it to infinite-dimensional spaces as a projective system. This leads to the notion of cylindrical measure, which according to Israel Moiseevich Gelfand and Naum Yakovlevich Vilenkin, originates from Andrei Nikolayevich Kolmogorov.

=== Cylindrical Measures ===
Let $(X, \mathcal{T})$ be a topological vector space over $\mathbb{R}$ and $X^*$ its algebraic dual space. Furthermore, let $F$ be a vector space of linear functionals on $X$, that is $F \subseteq X^*$.

A set function

$$\nu: \mathcal{Zyl}(X, F) \to \mathbb{R}+$$

is called a cylindrical measure if, for every finite subset $G := \{f_1, \dots, f_n\} \subseteq F$ with $n \in \mathbb{N}$, the restriction

$$\nu: \mathcal{E}(X, G) \to \mathbb{R}+$$

is a σ-additive function, i.e. $\nu$ is a measure.

Let $\Gamma \subset X^*$. A cylindrical measure $\mu$ on $X$ is said to have weak order $p$ (or to be of weak type $p$) if the $p$-th weak moment exists, that is,

$$\int_E |\langle f, x \rangle|^p d\mu(f) < \infty$$

for all $f \in \Gamma$.

=== Radon measure ===
Every Radon measure induces a cylindrical measure but the converse is not true. Let $E$ and $G$ be two locally convex space, then an operator $T:E\to G$ is called a $(q,p)$-radonifying operator, if for a cylindrical measure $\mu$ of order $q$ on $E$ the image measure $T_*\mu$ is a Radon measure of order $p$ on $G$.

=== Some results ===
There are many results on when a cylindrical measure can be extended to a Radon measure, such as Minlos theorem and Sazonov theorem.

Let $A$ be a balanced, convex, bounded and closed subset of a locally convex space $E$, then $E_A$ denoted the subspace of $E$ which is generated by $A$. A balanced, convex, bounded subset $A$ of a locally convex Hausdorff space $E$ is called a Hilbert set if the Banach space $E_A$ has a Hilbert space structure, i.e. the norm $\|\cdot\|_{E_A}$ of $E_A$ can be deduced from a scalar product and $E_A$ is complete.

==== A theorem by Sazonov-Badrikian ====
Let $E$ be a quasi-complete locally convex Hausdorff space and $E'_c$ be its dual equipped with the topology of uniform convergence on compact subsets in $E$ . Assume that every subset of $E$ is contained in a balanced, convex, compact Hilbert set. A function of positive type $f$ on $E'_c$ is the Fourier transform of a Radon measure on $E$ if and only if the function is continuous for the Hilbert-Schmidt topology associated with the topology of $E'_c$.

==== Minlos–Sasonov theorem ====
A slight variant of the theorem is the Minlos–Sazonov theorem which states that a cylindrical measure is σ-additive and Radon if it's Fourier transform is continuous in zero in the Sazonov topology.

== Bibliography ==
A valid standard reference is still the book published by Laurent Schwartz in 1973.

- Schwartz, Laurent (1973). Radon Measures on Arbitrary Topological Spaces and Cylindrical Measures. Notes by K.R. Parthasarathy, Tata Institute of Fundamental Research Lectures on Mathematics and Physics. London: Oxford University Press.
- Smolyanov, Oleg; Vladimir I. Bogachev (2017). Topological Vector Spaces and Their Applications. Germany: Springer International Publishing.
