= Box product =

Box product may refer to:

- The scalar triple product of three vectors
- A cartesian product of topological spaces equipped with the box topology
- The cartesian product of graphs
