= Grands Mulets Hut =

Mountain refuge in the Mont Blanc massif

Coordinates: 45°52′00″N 6°51′40″E

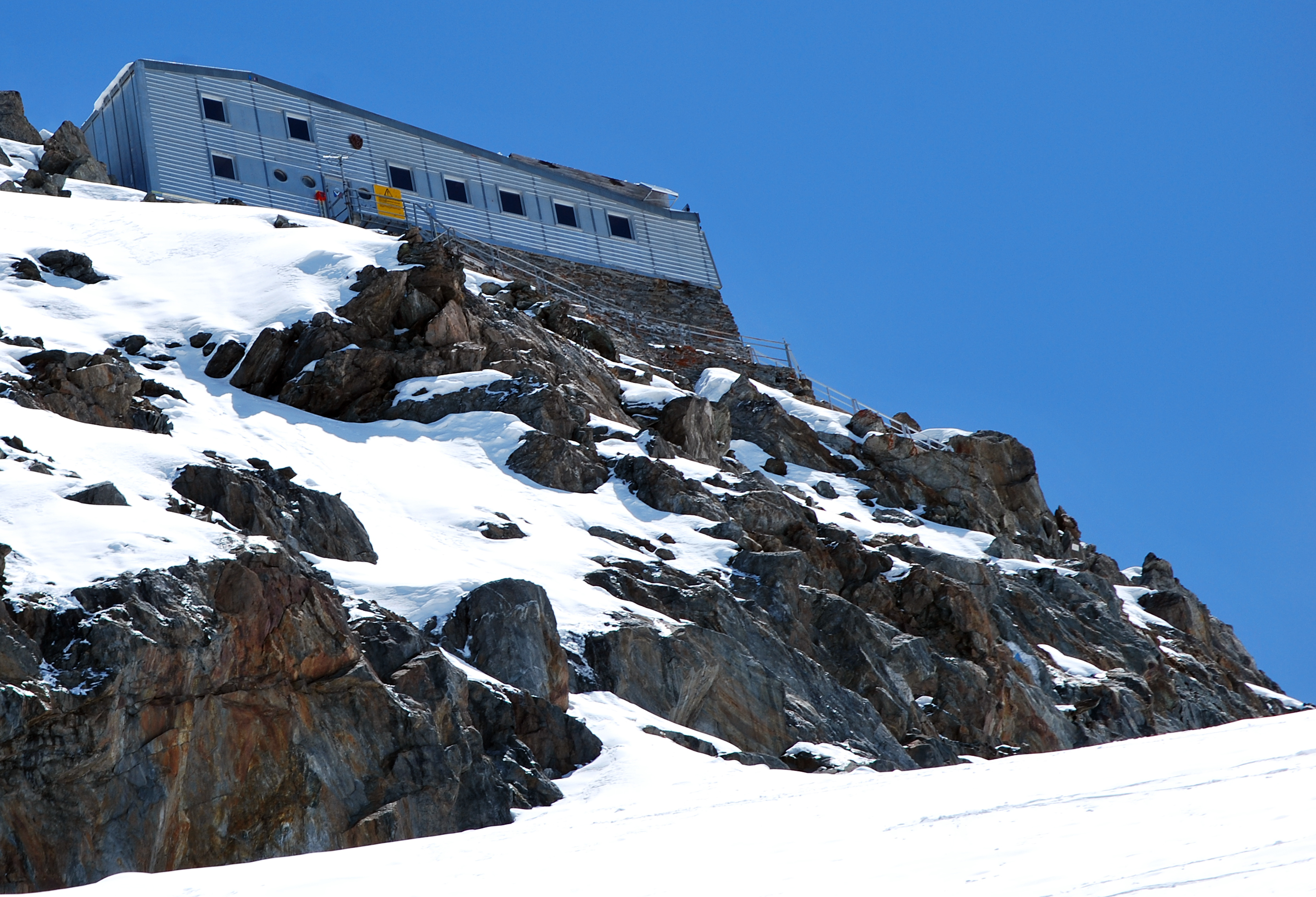
Grands Mulets Hut

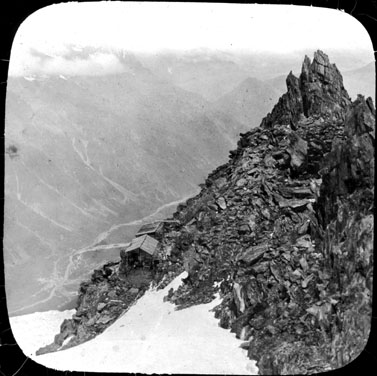
Early hut on rocher des Grands-Mulets, vallée de Chamonix (6350175296)

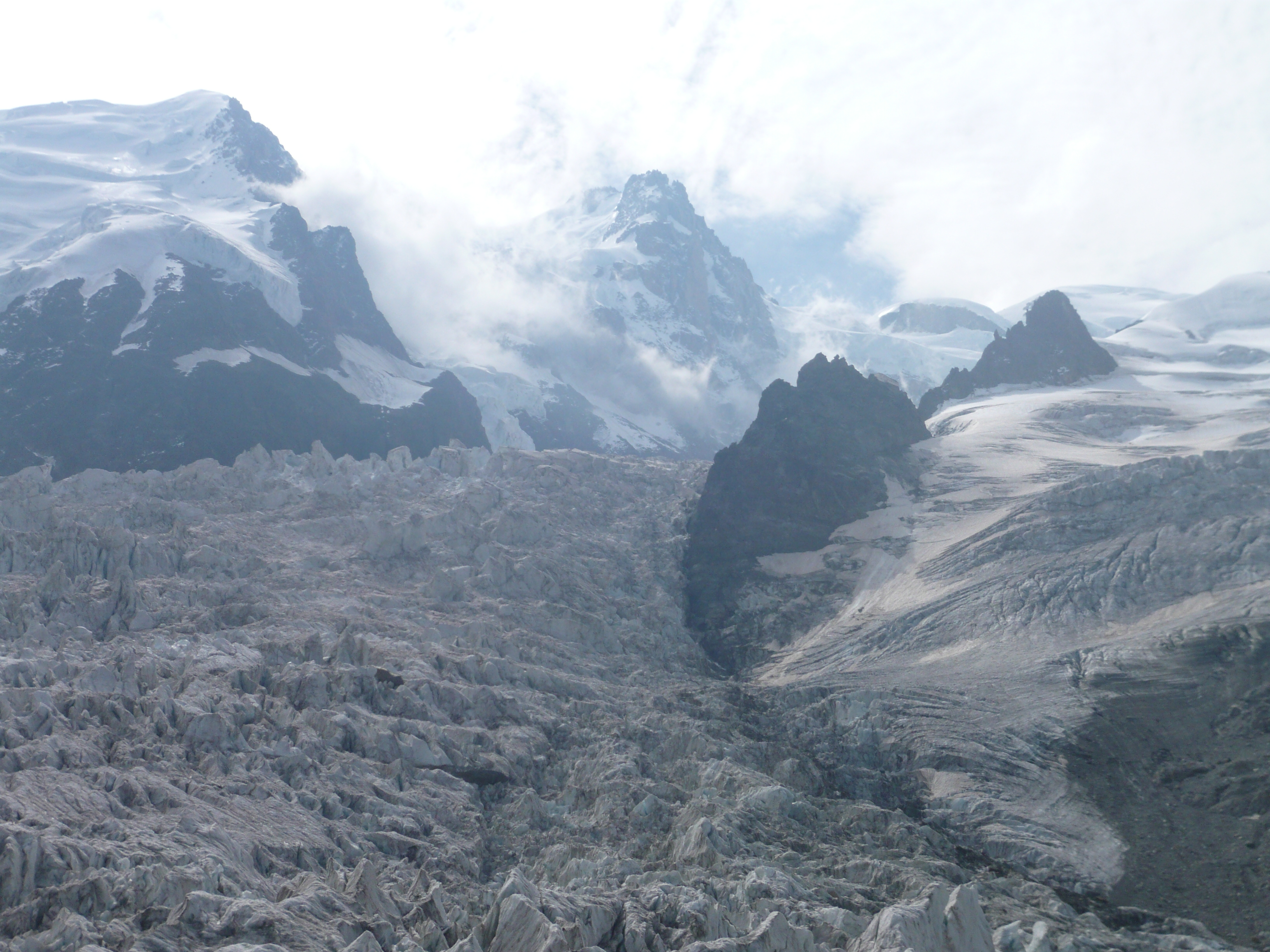
Les Grands Mulets, seen from below, showing the broken state of the Bossons Glacier

The Grands Mulets Hut (French: Refuge des Grands Mulets) is a mountain refuge in the Mont Blanc massif in the French Alps at an altitude of 3,051 m. It is owned by the Club Alpin Francais. The hut is located on a pyramidal rock island, at the junction of two streams of the Bossons Glacier on the north side of Mont Blanc. If the state of the glacier is not too severe, the hut is wardened in summer and can be used as an alternative route of ascent to the summit of Mont Blanc, following the original historic route by the first ascensionists. Nowadays the hut is used more frequently by ski-mountaineers in spring, or as a more sheltered and alternative route of descent from Mont Blanc than the much more popular Goûter route, though route-finding can be difficult in fog and requires prior knowledge of the crevassed state of the Bossons glacier below the hut.

The first Grands Mulets hut was built in 1853, then replaced in 1896. The current refuge was built in 1960 and inaugurated on August 7 by Maurice Herzog.
