= Albert Badrikian =

French mathematician

Albert Badrikian (January 11, 1933, in Lyon – July 31, 1994, in a crevasse of the Bossons Glacier in the Mont Blanc massif) was a French mathematician and professor of mathematics at the Blaise Pascal University. Badrikian co-founded the renowned and influential summer school École d’Été de Probabilités de Saint-Flour with Paul-Louis Hennequin.

He specialized in stochastic processes, measure theory, and ε-entropy in information theory.

== Early life and education ==
Badrikian was born on January 11, 1933, in Lyon, as the third child of a family that had immigrated from Armenia. He attended university in Lyon, where he wrote two thesis papers, including one on stochastic processes in Banach spaces, and completed his Diplôme d’études supérieures spécialisées in 1952. Afterward, he worked for several years as an assistant and teacher in secondary schools.

Afterwards he became a research intern at the CNRS in the Laboratoire de Probabilités at Université Paris IV in Paris, under the guidance of Robert Fortet. He served in the French military from 1960 to 1962. After returning to the CNRS in 1962, he began his doctoral studies under Fortet's supervision. During this period, he also sought advice from Laurent Schwartz. On December 18, 1967, he defended his dissertation Les éléments aléatoires vectoriels et leurs fonctionnelles caractéristiques and received the CNRS Bronze Medal for his work.

In the late 1965 Badrikian received an invitation to the Université Blaise Pascal in Clermont-Ferrand, where he became a lecturer in 1968, a professor without chair in 1970, and a titular professor in 1972. He was instrumental in acquiring many books from the Russian school of mathematics for the university library. It was also particularly important to him to introduce young students to research. Between 1967 and 1969, he published articles on cylindrical measures and linear random functions, which were later compiled into a book titled Séminaire sur les fonctions aléatoires linéaires et les mesures cylindriques in 1970. During this time, French probabilists had frequent interactions, and probability theorists from Clermont-Ferrand, Lyon, and Dijon met quarterly. Badrikian also attended the NATO summer school on probabilistic methods in analysis and was a guest lecturer at Université du Québec, University of Toronto, and in Vienna.

From 1969 to 1970 Badrikian participated in the Laurent Schwartz seminar and gave five lectures there. In April 1971 he attended the Colloquium on Functional Analysis in Bordeaux, and in June 1973, he visited the Colloquium on Gaussian Processes in Strasbourg with Simon Chevet. In 1971, he co-founded the École d’Été de Probabilités de Saint-Flour with Paul-Louis Hennequin. In 1974, Badrikian held a course titled Prolegomenon to Probability Calculus in Banach Spaces, which was later published.

In 1982 he lectured at University of Mossul in Iraq, and in the same year he was invited to speak at the international colloquium on Measure Theory and Its Applications at Université de Sherbrooke in Canada. He returned to Sherbrooke in 1986 and gave a lecture on stochastic analysis. In 1987, he visited Sherbrooke again, as well as the universities in Montreal and Ottawa. In 1988, he was invited to the Chinese-French Center for Mathematics in Wuhan, China, where he visited seven times before his death. In 1989, he gave a course on stochastic integration and stochastic differential equations at Universidad de Chile in Santiago de Chile. In 1990, he was promoted from associate professor to extraordinary professor. In 1991, he was invited by the Latin American School for Probability and Statistics to give a course. In 1992, he went to Wrocław in Poland to establish a scientific partnership.

Badrikian died on July 31, 1994, in a fall into a crevasse on the Glacier des Bossons while preparing for a new ascent of the Mont Blanc massif.

Badrikian was the doctoral advisor of Pierre Bernard.

== Awards ==
- CNRS Bronze Medal
- Member of the American Mathematical Society.

== Publications (Selection) ==
- Propriétés permanentes des trajectoires de processus, in Colloque d'analyse fonctionnelle (Bordeaux, 1971), Mémoires de la Société Mathématique de France, no. 31-32 (1972), pp. 21–29. doi:10.24033/msmf.59
- with S. Chevet: Questions liées à la théorie des espaces de Wiener. Colloque sur les processus Gaussiens et sur les distributions aléatoires. Strasbourg 1973. Annales de l'Institut Fourier, volume 24 (1974) no. 2, pp. 1–25.
- Prolégomènes au calcul des probabilités dans les Banach. Ecole d’Eté de Saint-Flour (1975). Springer-Berlin (L.N.539) (1976)
- Fonctions convexes et mesures cylindriques. Conv. sull misure su gruppi e su spazi vect. Rome 1975. Academic Press, London (1977) pp. 139–176.
- Transformation of Gaussian Measures. Ecole Latino Americaine de Proba. et Stats., Santiago du Chili 1991. (dans cet ouvrage pp. 13–58).
- Calcul stochastique anticipatif par rapport à une mesure Gaussienne. Séminaire d’analyse moderne, Sherbrooke, Juillet 1986. Université de Sherbrooke (1988) 270p
- with G. W. Johnson and Il Yoo: The composition of operator-valued measurable functions is measurable. Proc. A.M.S., Vol.123, n°6, Juin 1995, pp. 1815–1820.
- with Ali S. Üstünel: Radonification of cylindrical semimartingales on Hilbert spaces. Annales mathématiques Blaise Pascal, volume 3 (1996) no. 1, pp. 13–21.
- Measurable linear mappings from a Wiener space. Annales mathématiques Blaise Pascal, volume S3 (1996), pp. 59–113.
- Martingales hilbertiennes. Annales mathématiques Blaise Pascal, volume S3 (1996), pp. 115–171.

=== Books ===
- Séminaire sur les Fonctions Aléatoires Linéaires et les Mesures Cylindriques (1970). Lecture Notes in Mathematics, vol 139. Springer, Berlin, Heidelberg. doi:10.1007/BFb0067894
- Mesures Cylindriques, Espaces de Wiener et Fonctions Aléatoires Gaussiennes (1974). Lecture Notes in Mathematics, vol 379. Springer, Berlin, Heidelberg. doi:10.1007/BFb0060494
- with Jia-An Yan and Paul-André Meyer: Probability And Statistics: French-Chinese Meeting – Proceedings Of The Wuhan Meeting. (1993). Singapore: World Scientific Publishing Company.

== Bibliography ==
- Hennequin, Paul-Louis (1996). "L'œuvre scientifique d'Albert Badrikian". Annales mathématiques Blaise Pascal (in French). S3: 1–11.
