= Laurent Petit =

French chef (born 1963)

- Born: 22 June 1963 (age 63); Bussières-lès-Belmont, Haute-Marne, France
- Culinary career
- Cooking style: Haute cuisine
- Rating
- Michelin stars
- Current restaurant
- Le Clos des Sens (Annecy)
- Website: www.closdessens.com

Laurent Petit (born 22 June 1963) is a French chef, three stars at the Guide Michelin and established in Annecy.

== Biography ==
Laurent Petit was born in Bussières-lès-Belmont, a village of 700 habitants located in the department of Haute-Marne, where his father is butcher-charcutier. The smells of pâtés en croûte, dried sausages, and black blood sausage, are his first culinary emotions. A dissipated and rebel student, he was oriented, without great conviction, at the École Hôtelière Saint-Exupéry of Saint-Dizier where he obtained a Certificat d'Aptitude Professionnelle (CAP) in cooking in 1981.

After his military service, he was hired in 1984 as a cooking assistant in the restaurant Pied de Cochon, located in the Quartier des Halles of Paris, then by Nicolas de Rabaudy, at that time restaurant owner of the future Bistrot du sommelier, where Laurent Petit worked alongside sommelier Philippe Faure-Brac. Nicolas de Rabaudy then sent him doing internships in Michelin-starred restaurants. In spring 1984, Laurent Petit did an internship with 3-starred chef Michel Guérard where he has a culinary shock and developed a passion for gastronomy. During those internships, he was also trained alongside Gérard Boyer in Reims, Charles Barrier in Tours, Jean-Pierre Billoux in Dijon and Roger Vergé in Mougins.

In June 1987, at age 24, Laurent Petit opened his first restaurant in Briançon named Le Péché Gourmand. He then met Martine Coin at Serre Chevallier, who has a certificate in cooking and owned a crêperie in the same location. Together, they decide to establish themselves definitely in Annecy, where they opened in 1992 their restaurant Le Clos des Sens.

In 2000, Le Clos des Sens obtained its first star at the Guide Michelin. In 2005, Laurent Petit created the contemporary brasserie ContreSens, near the train station of Annecy. In 2007, his restaurant Le Clos des Sens obtained its second star at the Guide Michelin, while the ContreSens obtained a "Bib Gourmand".

In 2009, Le Clos des Sens acquired the Café Brunet in Annecy-le-Vieux, a house of the 14th century including a culinary café since 1875. In 2012, Le Clos des Sens tripled its surface buying the communal school, a historical building of the Second French Empire. It became a 5-starred hotel in 2015 and a member of the Relais & Châteaux in 2016.

Alongside Alain Ducasse and Joël Robuchon, Laurent Petit is in 2011 one of the founding members of the Collège Culinaire de France, planning to promote the identity of French cuisine.

In 2015, Laurent Petit made his "cooking out", a term that he employs to qualify a restart of his own cooking style as a reorientation on local food and giving up meat, centering again on the vegetable.

He is already among the most cited chefs to obtain a third star at the Guide Michelin of 2018, and finally obtained it the next year on 21 January 2019.

== Bibliography ==
- Images cuisinées des grands lacs de Savoie, AutreVue (2007)
- Le Clos des Sens, Éditions Glénat, (2012)
- Café Brunet cuisine canaille, Éditions Inverse
- Best Of Laurent Petit, Ducasse Édition (2018)

== See also ==
- List of Michelin 3-star restaurants
