= Hôtel Byblos =

Hotel in St.-Tropez, France

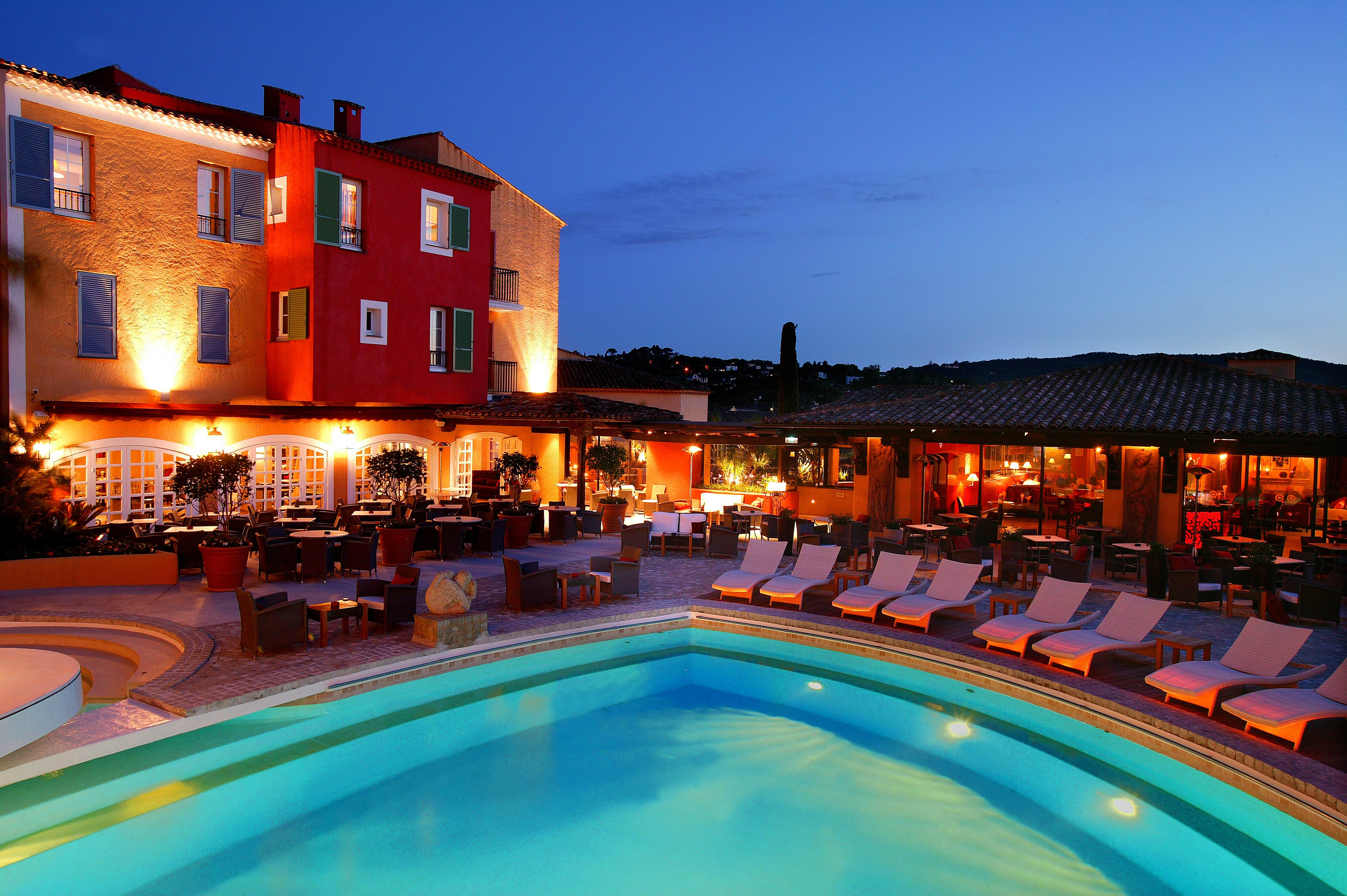
The Hôtel Byblos is a Grand Hotel built in the mid-1960s.

Hôtel Byblos, or Le Byblos, is a luxury hotel in Saint-Tropez, in the Var region in France, built by Lebanese hotelier Jean-Prosper Gay-Para. The hotel is open from April to October and is closed for winter. It has 91 rooms, of which 50 are suites. The hotel looks like a hamlet, a set of small buildings attached to each other over an area of 5,500 m2.

== History ==
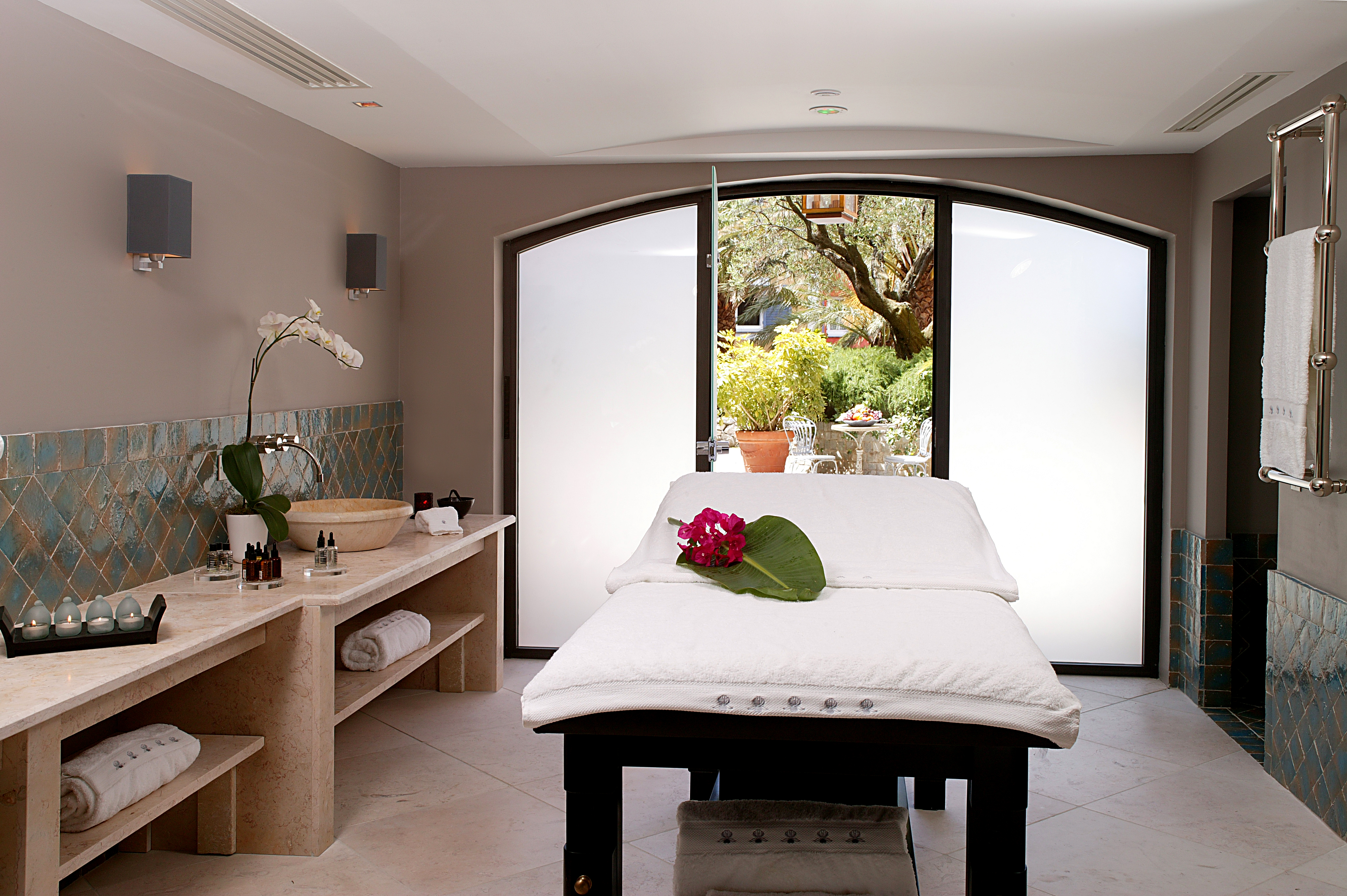
Le spa Sisley.

According to legend, Jean-Prosper Gay-Para, a billionaire Lebanese hotelier dreamed of building a palace for Brigitte Bardot, with whom he was infatuated. Building on this "Phoenician" and "Tropezian" style hotel began in 1965, with an architecture very different from that of the large luxury hotels of Cannes or Monte-Carlo, it was named after the Lebanese port city of Byblos that was frequented by Lebanese and international jet setters.

The hotel was inaugurated on May 27, 1967, in the presence of French models and actresses Mireille Darc and Brigitte Bardot. There were more than 700 guests, many of whom were celebrities, such as Françoise Sagan, René Clair, Maurice Escande, Bernard and Annabel Buffet, Eddie Barclay, Jean Lescudier (mayor of Saint-Tropez), Jean-Paul Roy (governor of the Var Region), Alexandre de Paris, Paco Rabanne, Jean Bousquet, Gérard Khoury (Director of Tourism in Lebanon), Lucien Barrière, Jacques Chazot, Juliette Greco, Michel Piccoli, Gilbert Trigano, Eddy Mitchell and Michel Polnareff. Subsequently, many media personalities continue to pass through this hotel or its nightclub.

The team surrounded Jean-Prosper Gay-Para, his wife, Médéa, and Francis Ducluzeau, the director, who welcomed the guests from Saint-Tropez, Paris and Lebanese. In July 1967, "Les Caves du roy", a temple of Tropezian nights, opened its doors.

But when the Six-Day War broke out in June 1967, Jean-Prosper Gay-Para decided to return to Beirut to manage his hotels. The hotel was sold on September 19 to businessman Sylvain Floirat.

In 1971, Mick Jagger married Bianca Pérez Mora-Macias at the hotel, and it quickly became a popular destination for celebrities which has continued with contemporary stars like Lady Gaga staying the establishment.

On 28 June 2012, the hotel received the prestigious French designation of palace. The designation is awarded for a limited period and must be periodically renewed. The hotel lost this distinction in 2025 and is no longer included in the official list of palace-designated establishments published by Atout France.

The Byblos called on the Italian architect and designer Antonio Citterio to design the restaurant called Rivea at Byblos.

In May 2017, le Byblos et les Caves du Roy celebrated their 50th anniversary. Several partnerships took place for this event, with Audemars Piguet, Rolls-Royce, Dom Pérignon, Goyard, Sisley and Missoni Home, which is redecorating the largest suite of the hotel (180 m2) and Les Caves du Roy was also remodeled for the occasion.

Byblos achieved a turnover of €21,950,200 in 2017. The average annual workforce is 140 employees.

== Films set at Le Byblos ==
- 1968 : Le gendarme se marie de Jean Girault avec Louis de Funès, Michel Galabru
- 1980 : Le Coup du parapluie de Gérard Oury avec Pierre Richard, Gérard Jugnot, Valérie Mairesse
- 1984 : L'Année des méduses de Christopher Frank avec Valérie Kaprisky et Bernard Giraudeau

== Other Articles ==
=== Other Links ===
- Palace (hôtel)
- Official website
