= Robert Minlos =

Russian mathematician

Robert Adol'fovich Minlos (Russian: Роберт Адольфович Минлос; 28 February 1931 – 9 January 2018) was a Soviet and Russian mathematician who has made important contributions to probability theory and mathematical physics. His theorem on the extension of cylindrical measures to Radon measures on the continuous dual of a nuclear space is of fundamental importance in the theory of generalized random processes.

He died on 9 January 2018 at the age of 86.
