= Cylinder set =

Natural basic set in product spaces

In mathematics, the cylinder sets form a basis of the product topology on a product of sets; they are also a generating family of the cylinder σ-algebra.

== General definition ==
Given a collection $S$ of sets, consider the Cartesian product $X = \prod_{Y\in S} Y$ of all sets in the collection. The canonical projection corresponding to some $Y\in S$ is the function $p_{Y} : X \to Y$ that maps every element of the product to its $Y$ component. A cylinder set is a preimage of a canonical projection or finite intersection of such preimages. Explicitly, it is a set of the form,
$$\bigcap_{i=1}^n p_{Y_i}^{-1} \left(A_i\right) = \left\{ \left(x\right) \in X \mid p_{Y_1}(x) \in A_1, \dots, p_{Y_n}(x) \in A_n\right\}$$
for any choice of $n$, finite sequence of sets $Y_1,...Y_n\in S$ and subsets $A_{i} \subseteq Y_i$ for $1 \leq i \leq n$.

Then, when all sets in $S$ are topological spaces, the product topology is generated by cylinder sets corresponding to the components' open sets. That is cylinders of the form $\bigcap_{i=1}^n p_{Y_i}^{-1} \left(U_i\right)$ where for each $i$, $U_i$ is open in $Y_i$. In the same manner, in case of measurable spaces, the cylinder σ-algebra is the one which is generated by cylinder sets corresponding to the components' measurable sets.

The restriction that the cylinder set be the intersection of a finite number of open cylinders is important; allowing infinite intersections generally results in a finer topology. In the latter case, the resulting topology is the box topology; cylinder sets are never Hilbert cubes.

== Cylinder sets in products of discrete sets ==
Let $S = \{1,2,\ldots,n\}$ be a finite set, containing n objects or letters. The collection of all bi-infinite strings in these letters is denoted by
$$S^\mathbb{Z} = \{ x = (\ldots, x_{-1}, x_0, x_1, \ldots) :
x_k \in S \; \forall k \in \mathbb{Z}\}.$$

The natural topology on $S$ is the discrete topology. Basic open sets in the discrete topology consist of individual letters; thus, the open cylinders of the product topology on $S^\mathbb{Z}$ are
$$C_t[a]= \{x \in S^\mathbb{Z} : x_t = a \}.$$

The intersections of a finite number of open cylinders are the cylinder sets
$$\begin{align}
C_t[a_0, \ldots, a_m] & = C_t[a_0] \,\cap\, C_{t+1}[a_1] \,\cap \cdots \cap\, C_{t+m}[a_m] \\
& = \{x \in S^\mathbb{Z} : x_t = a_0, \ldots ,x_{t+m} = a_m \}
\end{align}.$$

Cylinder sets are clopen sets. As elements of the topology, cylinder sets are by definition open sets. The complement of an open set is a closed set, but the complement of a cylinder set is a union of cylinders, and so cylinder sets are also closed, and are thus clopen.

== Definition for vector spaces ==
Given a finite or infinite-dimensional vector space $V$ over a field K (such as the real or complex numbers), the cylinder sets may be defined as
$$C_A[f_1, \ldots, f_n] = \{x \in V : (f_1(x),f_2(x),\ldots,f_n(x)) \in A \}$$
where $A \subset K^n$ is a Borel set in $K^n$, and each $f_j$ is a linear functional on $V$; that is, $f_j\in (V^*)^{\otimes n}$, the algebraic dual space to $V$. When dealing with topological vector spaces, the definition is made instead for elements $f_j \in (V')^{\otimes n}$, the continuous dual space. That is, the functionals $f_j$ are taken to be continuous linear functionals.

== Applications ==
Cylinder sets are often used to define a topology on sets that are subsets of $S^\mathbb{Z}$ and occur frequently in the study of symbolic dynamics; see, for example, subshift of finite type. Cylinder sets are often used to define a measure, using the Kolmogorov extension theorem; for example, the measure of a cylinder set of length m might be given by 1/m or by 1/2^{m}.

Cylinder sets may be used to define a metric on the space: for example, one says that two strings are ε-close if a fraction 1−ε of the letters in the strings match.

Since strings in $S^\mathbb{Z}$ can be considered to be p-adic numbers, some of the theory of p-adic numbers can be applied to cylinder sets, and in particular, the definition of p-adic measures and p-adic metrics apply to cylinder sets. These types of measure spaces appear in the theory of dynamical systems and are called nonsingular odometers. A generalization of these systems is the Markov odometer.

Cylinder sets over topological vector spaces are the core ingredient in the definition of abstract Wiener spaces, which provide the formal definition of the Feynman path integral or functional integral of quantum field theory, and the partition function of statistical mechanics.

== See also ==
- Filter on a set – Family of subsets representing "large" sets
- Filters in topology – Application of set theory concept
- Cylinder set measure
- Cylindrical σ-algebra
- Projection (set theory) – Operation selecting specific components or columns from a set, tuple, or relation
- Ultraproduct – Mathematical construction
