= Cylindrical σ-algebra =

In mathematics — specifically, in measure theory and functional analysis — the cylindrical σ-algebra or product σ-algebra is a type of σ-algebra which is often used when studying product measures or probability measures of random variables on Banach spaces.

For a product space, the cylinder σ-algebra is the one that is generated by cylinder sets.

In the context of a Banach space $X$ and its dual space of continuous linear functionals $X',$ the cylindrical σ-algebra $\mathfrak{A}(X,X')$ is defined to be the coarsest σ-algebra (that is, the one with the fewest measurable sets) such that every continuous linear function on $X$ is a measurable function. In general, $\mathfrak{A}(X,X')$ is not the same as the Borel σ-algebra on $X,$ which is the coarsest σ-algebra that contains all open subsets of $X.$

== Definition ==
Consider two topological vector spaces $N$ and $M$ with dual pairing $\langle,\rangle:=\langle,\rangle_{N,M}$, then we can define the so called Borel cylinder sets

$$C_{f_1,\dots,f_m,B}=\{x\in N\colon (\langle x,f_1\rangle,\dots,\langle x,f_m\rangle)\in B\}$$

for some $f_1,\dots,f_m\in M$ and $B\in \mathcal{B}(\mathbb{R}^m)$. The family of all these sets is denoted as $\mathfrak{A}_{f_1,\dots,f_n}$. Then

$$\operatorname{Cyl}(N,M)=\bigotimes_n \mathfrak{A}_{f_1,\dots,f_n}$$

is called the cylindrical algebra. Equivalently one can also look at the open cylinder sets and get the same algebra.

The cylindrical σ-algebra $\mathfrak{A}(N,M)=\sigma(\operatorname{Cyl}(N,M))$ is the σ-algebra generated by the cylindrical algebra.

== Properties ==
- Let $X$ a Hausdorff locally convex space which is also a hereditarily Lindelöf space, then

$\mathfrak{A}(X,X')=\mathcal{B}(X).$

== See also ==
- Cylinder set
- Cylinder set measure
- Measure theory in topological vector spaces
