= Box topology =

Concept in General Topology

In topology, the cartesian product of topological spaces can be given several different topologies. One of the more natural choices is the box topology, where a base is given by the Cartesian products of open sets in the component spaces. Another possibility is the product topology, where a base is also given by the Cartesian products of open sets in the component spaces, but only finitely many of which can be unequal to the entire component space.

While the box topology has a somewhat more intuitive definition than the product topology, it satisfies fewer desirable properties. In particular, if all the component spaces are compact, the box topology on their Cartesian product will not necessarily be compact, although the product topology on their Cartesian product will always be compact. In general, the box topology is finer than the product topology, although the two agree in the case of finite direct products (or when all but finitely many of the factors are trivial).

== Definition ==
Given $X$ such that

$$X := \prod_{i \in I} X_i,$$

or the (possibly infinite) Cartesian product of the topological spaces $X_i$, indexed by $i \in I$, the box topology on $X$ is generated by the base

$$\mathcal{B} = \left\{ \prod_{i \in I} U_i \mid U_i \text{ open in } X_i \right\}.$$

The name box comes from the case of R^{n}, in which the basis sets look like boxes. The set $\prod_{i \in I} X_i$ endowed with the box topology is sometimes denoted by $\underset{i \in I}{\square} X_i.$

== Properties ==
Box topology on R^{ω}:

- The box topology is completely regular
- The box topology is neither compact nor connected
- The box topology is not first countable (hence not metrizable)
- The box topology is not separable
- The box topology is paracompact (and hence normal) if the continuum hypothesis is true. It is unknown whether the continuum hypothesis is necessary to show this.

=== Example — failure of continuity ===
The following example is based on the Hilbert cube. Let R^{ω} denote the countable cartesian product of R with itself, i.e. the set of all sequences in R. Equip R with the standard topology and R^{ω} with the box topology. Define:

$$\begin{cases} f : \mathbf{R} \to \mathbf{R}^\omega \\ x \mapsto (x,x,x, \ldots) \end{cases}$$

So all the component functions are the identity and hence continuous, however we will show f is not continuous. To see this, consider the open set

$$U = \prod_{n=1}^{\infty} \left ( -\tfrac{1}{n}, \tfrac{1}{n} \right ).$$

Suppose f were continuous. Then, since:

$$f(0) = (0,0,0, \ldots ) \in U,$$

there should exist $\varepsilon > 0$ such that $(-\varepsilon, \varepsilon) \subset f^{-1}(U).$ But this would imply that

$$f\left (\tfrac{\varepsilon}{2} \right ) = \left ( \tfrac{\varepsilon}{2}, \tfrac{\varepsilon}{2}, \tfrac{\varepsilon}{2}, \ldots \right ) \in U,$$

which is false since $\tfrac{\varepsilon}{2} > \tfrac{1}{n}$ for $n > \tfrac{2}{\varepsilon}.$ Thus f is not continuous even though all its component functions are.

=== Example — failure of compactness ===
Consider the countable product $X = \prod_{i \in \N} X_i$ where for each i, $X_i = \{0,1\}$ with the discrete topology. The box topology on $X$ will also be the discrete topology. Since discrete spaces are compact if and only if they are finite, we immediately see that $X$ is not compact, even though its component spaces are.

$X$ is not sequentially compact either: consider the sequence $\{x_n\}_{n=1}^\infty$ given by

$$(x_n)_m=\begin{cases}
0 & m < n \\
1 & m \ge n
\end{cases}$$

Since no two points in the sequence are the same, the sequence has no limit point, and therefore $X$ is not sequentially compact.

=== Convergence in the box topology ===
Topologies are often best understood by describing how sequences converge. In general, a Cartesian product of a space $X$ with itself over an indexing set $S$ is precisely the space of functions from $S$ to $X$, denoted $\prod_{s \in S} X = X^S$. The product topology yields the topology of pointwise convergence; sequences of functions converge if and only if they converge at every point of $S$.

Because the box topology is finer than the product topology, convergence of a sequence in the box topology is a more stringent condition. Assuming $X$ is Hausdorff, a sequence $(f_n)_n$ of functions in $X^S$ converges in the box topology to a function $f\in X^S$ if and only if it converges pointwise to $f$ and there is a finite subset $S_0\subset S$ and there is an $N$ such that for all $n>N$ the sequence $(f_n(s))_n$ in $X$ is constant for all $s\in S\setminus S_0$. In other words, the sequence $(f_n(s))_n$ is eventually constant for nearly all $s$ and in a uniform way.

== Comparison with product topology ==
The basis sets in the product topology have almost the same definition as the above, except with the qualification that all but finitely many U_{i} are equal to the component space X_{i}. The product topology satisfies a very desirable property for maps f_{i} : Y → X_{i} into the component spaces: the product map f: Y → X defined by the component functions f_{i} is continuous if and only if all the f_{i} are continuous. As shown above, this does not always hold in the box topology. This actually makes the box topology very useful for providing counterexamples—many qualities such as compactness, connectedness, metrizability, etc., if possessed by the factor spaces, are not in general preserved in the product with this topology.

== See also ==
- Cylinder set
- List of topologies
