= Bossons Glacier =

Glacier of the Mont Blanc massif, in France

Coordinates: 45°53′N 6°52′E

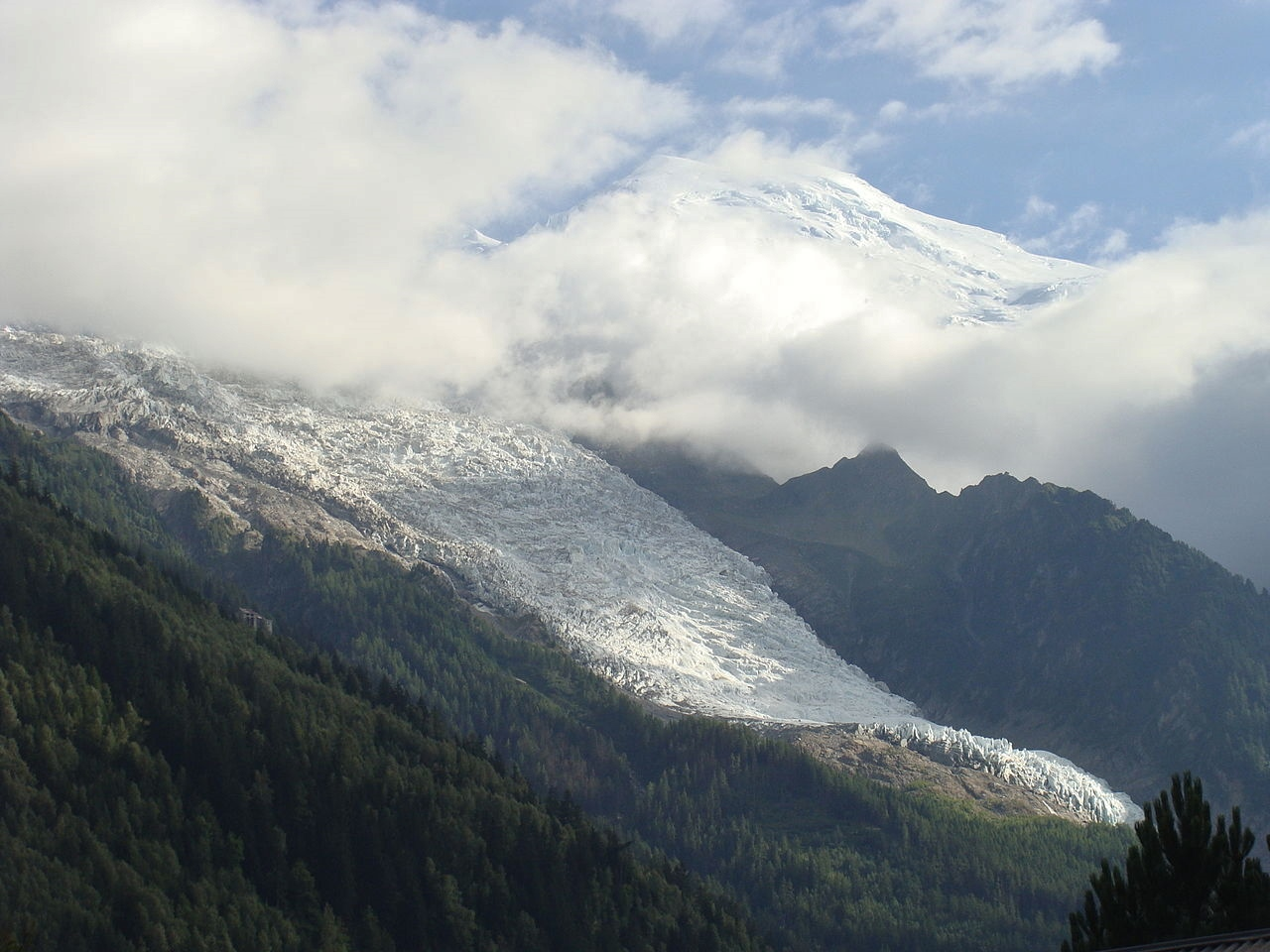
Bossons Glacier in 2014

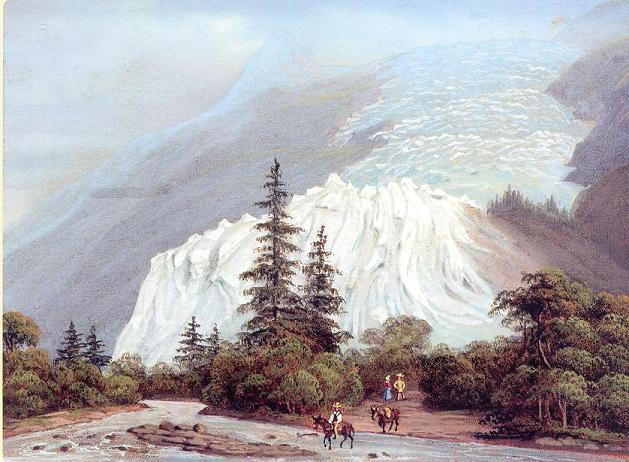
Bossons Glacier in 1830

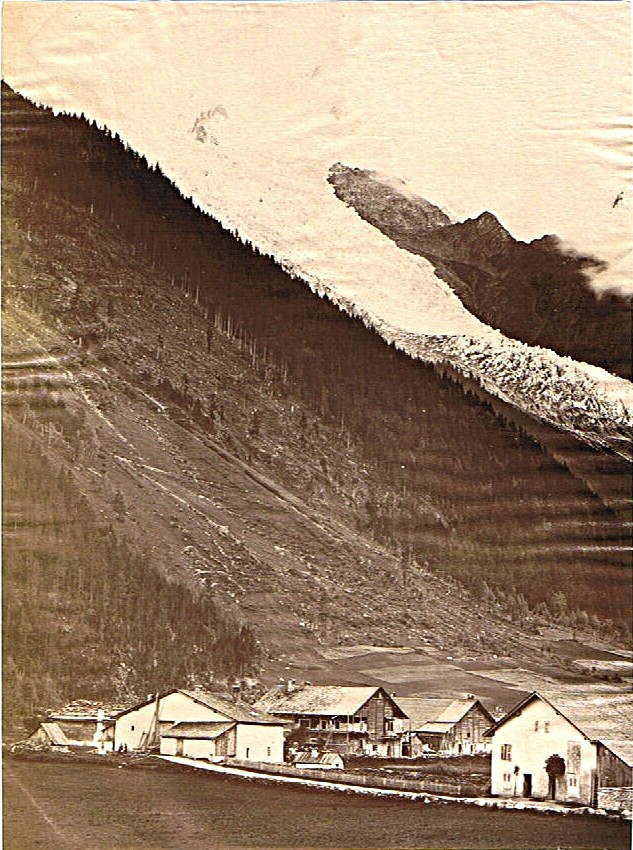
Bossons Glacier in 1890

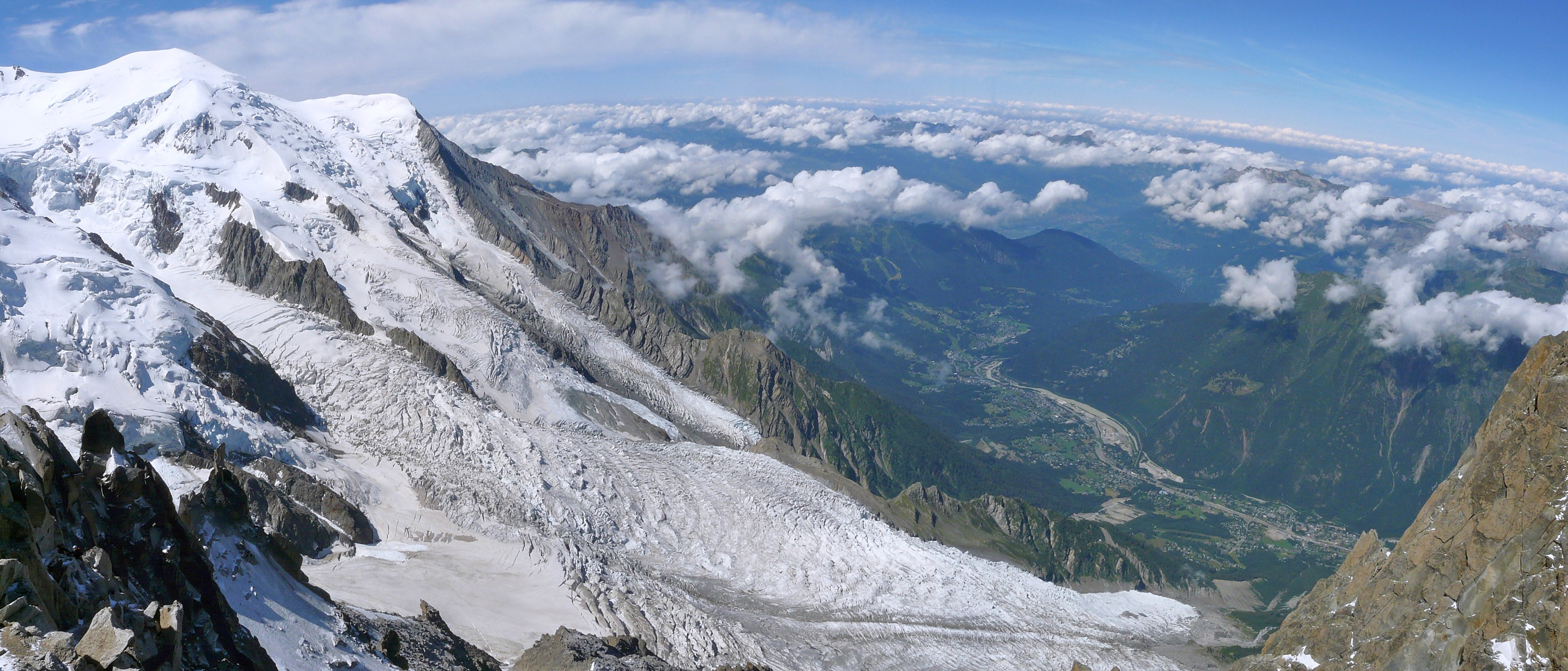
Bossons Glacier and Taconnaz Glacier from Aiguille du Midi, 2009

The Bossons Glacier is one of the larger glaciers of the Mont Blanc massif of the Alps, found in the Chamonix valley of Haute-Savoie département, south-eastern France. It is fed from icefields lying on the northern side of Mont Blanc, and descends close to the Aiguille du Midi and ends on the southern side of the Arve valley, close to the town of Chamonix. It has the largest altitudinal drop of all the alpine glaciers in Europe, and formerly extended much further down the valley than it does today. It is now approximately 7.5 km long, with a surface area of approximately 10 km^{2}.

In the 17th century the Bossons glacier extended right down into Chamonix, reaching the settlement of Le Fouly, engulfing farmland, barns and houses. Local bishops were called upon to exorcise the demons within the glacier. In 1777 the traveller and correspondent, William Coxe, observed in his letters that "we mounted by the side of the glacier of Bosson, to les Murailles de Glace, so called from their resemblance to walls: they form the large ranges of ice of prodigious thickness and solidity, rising abruptly and parallel to each other. Some of these ranges appeared about a hundred feet high. Near them were pyramids and cone of ice of all forms and sizes, shooting to a very considerable height, in the most beautiful and fantastic shapes." He then noted that, on his return in 1785, "these murailles de glace no longer existed". By around 1784 the glacier had started to retreat, although there was a renewed surge around 1815 and the frightened community erected a cross in front of its snout, which served as a marker for glacial retreat for the next 100 years.

In 1900 the snout of the glacier was still reaching down into the valley bottom at an altitude of 1,050 metres above sea level. By 1980 the snout only reached down to about 1,200 metres, and by 2008 it had melted backwards even further backwards, ended at around 1,400 metres, albeit still well below the treeline. A series of paintings from the early 19th century and modern day photographs reveal the extent of the glacier's recession as the climate has warmed, as well as revealing evidence of glacial moraines showing its past extent down to the valley bottom.

== Mt Hamel catastrophe ==
On the 20th of August 1820, an avalanche killed three Chamonix guides of the expedition of Dr Joseph Hamel, a Russian naturalist. The guides were lost after they were swept into a crevasse following the party's 1,200-foot fall in an avalanche. In August 1861 two of the bodies were discovered at the terminus of the glacier. Two of the surviving guides from the expedition were still alive, and one, 72 year-old Joseph-Marie Couttet, positively identified the remains.

== See also ==
- List of glaciers
