= Minlos's theorem =

In the mathematics of topological vector spaces, Minlos's theorem states that a cylindrical measure on the dual of a nuclear space is a Radon measure if its Fourier transform is continuous. It is named after Robert Adol'fovich Minlos and can be proved using Sazonov's theorem.
