= Palace (hotel) =

Type of luxury hotel in France

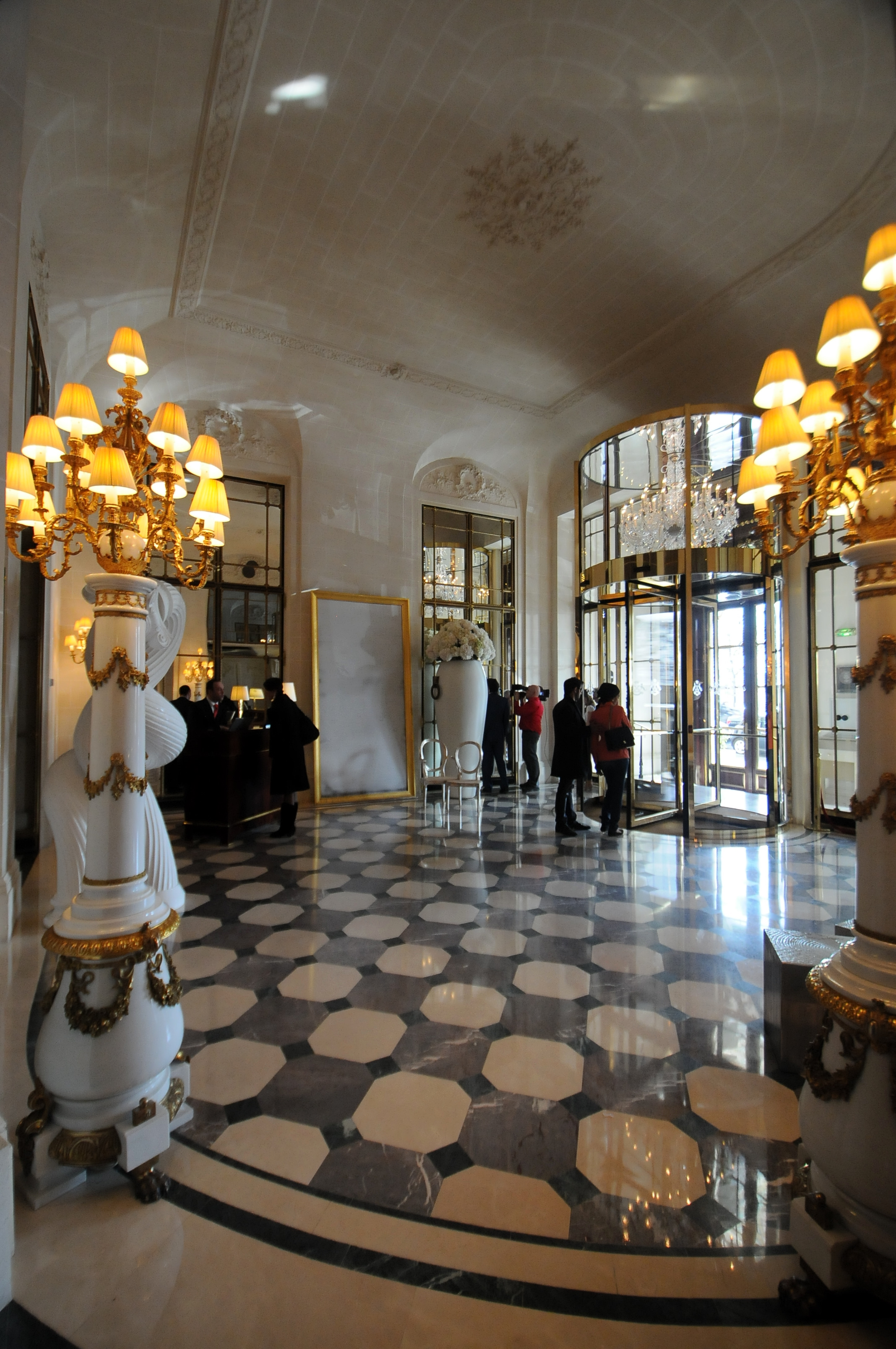
Entrance to Le Meurice in Paris, an official Palace hotel

In the French hotel industry, the term palace is particularly reserved for certain establishments, in a strict sense, specifically being used to describe a luxury hotel. Since 2010, the title has been officially designated by Atout France as a grade classification of certain French hotels, around half of which are located in Paris. It is exclusively awarded to five-star hotels offering the highest level of service to their customers. At the end of August 2017, only 31 hotels out of 343 have been admitted to this category.

The term is used sometimes by other French hotels (at least in their commercial name; for example, the former Élysée Palace hotel in Paris) that do not yet meet the criteria defined by law.

== List of French official Palace hotels ==
Classification in 2018
Name	Labelization	Location	Inauguration	Michelin star restaurant (Note: Some hotels have two or more restaurants, each having their own Michelin star(s).)
Le Meurice	May 2011	Paris (1st)	1835	
Hôtel du Palais	May 2011	Biarritz	1893	
Grand Hôtel du Cap-Ferrat	May 2011	Saint-Jean-Cap-Ferrat	1908	
Plaza Athénée	May 2011	Paris (8th)	1913	
Le Bristol	May 2011	Paris (8th)	1925	+
Les Airelles	May 2011	Courchevel	1992	
Park Hyatt Paris-Vendôme	May 2011	Paris (2nd)	2002	
Cheval Blanc Courchevel	May 2011	Courchevel	2006	
Four Seasons Hotel George V	September 2011	Paris (8th)	1928	+ +
Hôtel Byblos	June 2012	Saint-Tropez	1967	
Hôtel Château de la Messardière	June 2012	Saint-Tropez	1992	
Hôtel La Réserve	June 2012	Ramatuelle	2003 (Note: Although the buildings were first constructed in the 1970s, the establishment had been abandoned before Michel Reybier acquired it in 1997. Reybier reopened in 2003 as 12 villas with 51 rooms. Finally, under the leadership of the architect Jean-Michel Wilmotte, now a member of the juries, the establishment was transformed in 2009 into a luxury hotel, with only 7 rooms and 16 suites. Therefore, there is no continuity between the two managements.)	
Royal Monceau	June 2013	Paris (8th)	1928	+
Shangri-La Paris	July 2014	Paris (16th)	2010	+
Le K2	July 2014	Courchevel	2011	
Mandarin Oriental, Paris	July 2014	Paris (1st)	2011	
Hôtel du Cap-Eden-Roc	July 2016	Antibes	1870	
Cheval Blanc St-Barth	July 2016	Saint-Barthélemy	1991	
The Peninsula Paris	July 2016	Paris (16th)	2014	
La Réserve Paris Hotel and Spa	November 2016	Paris (8th)	2015	
Hôtel Royal Evian	November 2016	Evian-les-Bains	1909	
La Bastide de Gordes	November 2016	Gordes	2008	
Les Sources de Caudalie	November 2016	Martillac	1961	
Les Prés d'Eugénie	July 2017	Eugénie-les-Bains	1961	
Hôtel de Crillon	September 2018	Paris (8th)	1909	
Hôtel Lutetia	October 2019	Paris (6th)	1910	
Cheval Blanc St-Tropez	October 2019	St-Tropez	1936	+
