= Hui-Hsiung Kuo =

Taiwanese-American mathematician (born 1941)

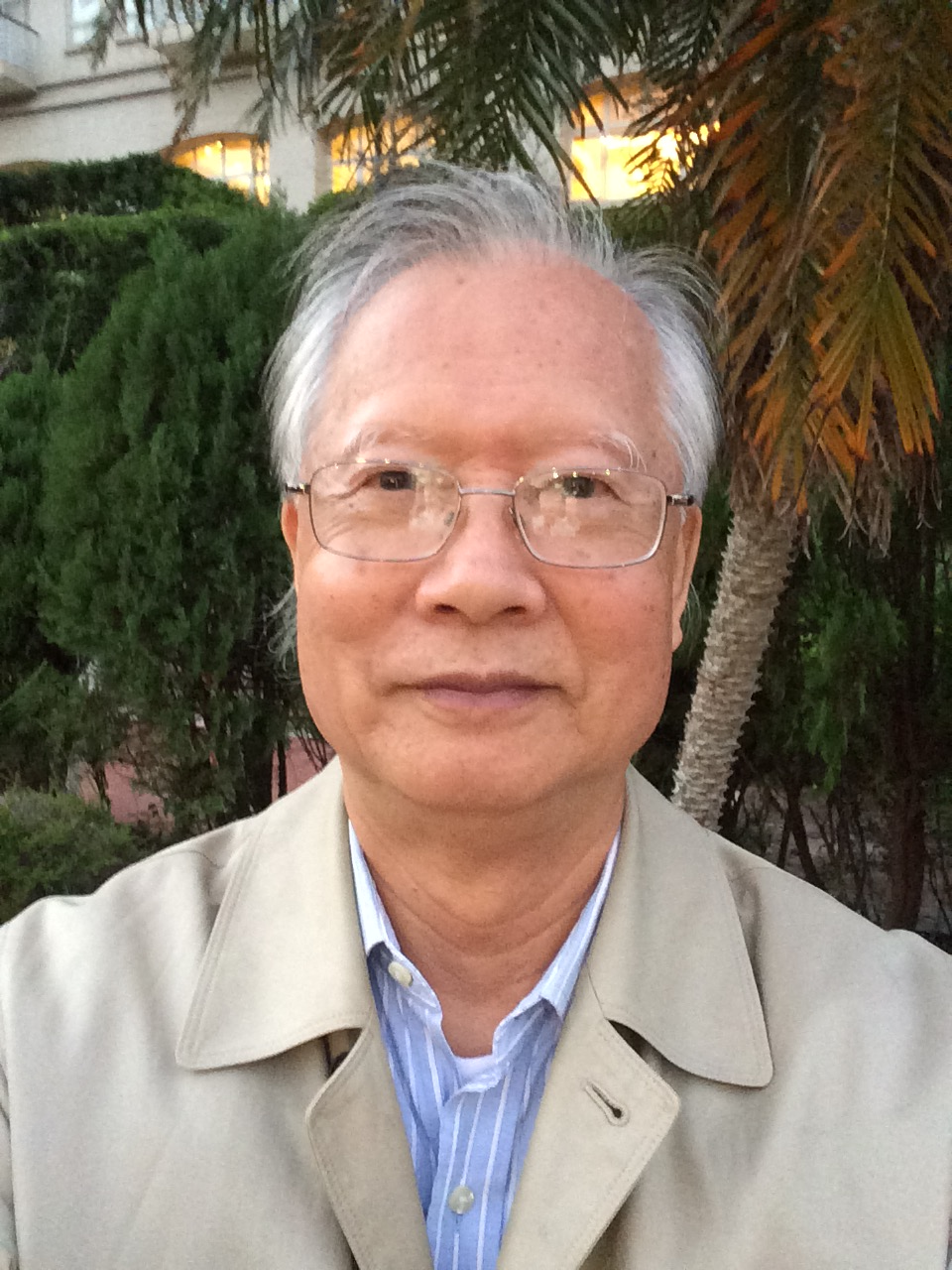
- Kuo in 2023
- Born: October 21, 1941 (age 85); Taichung, Taiwan
- Education: National Taiwan University (BS); Cornell University (MA, PhD)
- Known for: White noise analysis
- Scientific career
- Fields: Differential topology; Infinite dimensional analysis; white noise analysis; stochastic integration
- Workplaces: New York University; University of Virginia; Wayne State University; Louisiana State University; National Cheng Kung University
- Thesis: Integration Theory on Infinite Dimensional Manifolds (1970)
- Doctoral advisor: Leonard Gross

Hui-Hsiung Kuo (born October 21, 1941) is a Taiwanese-American mathematician, author, and academic. He is Nicholson Professor Emeritus at Louisiana State University and one of the founders of the field of white noise analysis.

Kuo is most known for his research in stochastic analysis, with a focus on stochastic integration, white noise theory, and infinite dimensional analysis. He together with T. Hida, J. Potthoff, and L. Streit founded the field of white noise analysis. He has authored several books, including White Noise: An Infinite-Dimensional Calculus, Introduction to Stochastic Integration, Gaussian Measures in Banach Spaces, and White Noise Distribution Theory and served as an editor for books, such as White Noise Analysis: Mathematics and Applications and Stochastic Analysis on Infinite-Dimensional Spaces. He has received the Graduate Teaching Award and Distinguished Faculty Award from Louisiana State University.

Kuo is a member of the Association of Quantum Probability and Infinite Dimensional Analysis. He has served on the Program Committee for the IFIP Conference and contributed to the Summer Institutes for the American Mathematical Society. He also serves as an associate editor for the Taiwanese Journal of Mathematics and holds the position of editor-in-chief for the Journal of Stochastic Analysis as well as Communications on Stochastic Analysis. He is an editor of Infinite Dimensional Analysis, Quantum Probability and Related Topics.

== Early life and education ==
Kuo was born in Taichung, Taiwan, the son of Kin-sueh and Fan-Po Kuo. He graduated from Taichung First High School in 1961. He earned his bachelor's degree in mathematics from National Taiwan University in 1965, then earned a Master of Arts in mathematics in 1968 and a Ph.D. in the subject in 1970 from Cornell University.

== Career ==
Kuo started his academic career as a Visiting Member at New York University's Courant Institute in 1970 and assumed the role of Assistant Professor at the University of Virginia in 1971. Following this, he became a Visiting Assistant Professor at the State University of New York and held the appointment of Associate Professor at Wayne State University in 1976. In 1977, he joined Louisiana State University, as an Associate Professor later assuming the role of full Professor in 1982 and serving as a Nicholson Professor of Mathematics from 2000 to 2014. Furthermore, he served as the NSC Chair Professor of Mathematics at National Cheng Kung University in 1998 and was appointed as a Fulbright Scholar Professor and Lecturer at the University of Roma Tor Vergata and University of Tunis El Manar. He has been serving as the Nicholson Professor Emeritus at LSU since 2014.

Kuo held various administrative positions starting with his role as a Foreign Faculty Member at Meijo University's Graduate School where he served from 1993 to 2013. In 1997, he served as an NSF Official Observer at Tulane University's Mathematical Sciences Research Institute and has been serving on the Board of Global Advisors for the International Federation of Nonlinear Analysis since 2010.

== Works ==
=== Gaussian measures in banach spaces ===
Kuo addressed the question of whether the Lebesgue measure can be extended to separable Hilbert spaces by exploring the conditions necessary for a valid measure through a contradiction involving orthonormal bases and defined balls. In his review, Michael B. Marcus noted that the book is organized to emphasize the abstract Wiener space in its initial section, which entails a complex and multi-step theory development process, yet the book meticulously guides to ensures that readers find the material accessible.

=== White noise distribution theory ===
Kuo’s book White Noise Distribution Theory provided an introduction to the fundamentals of white noise theory and offered insights into its mathematical foundations and practical applications. The book showed the relevance of white noise analysis in a series of stochastic cable equations.

=== Introduction to stochastic integration ===
Kuo's book Introduction to Stochastic Integration served as an introductory guide to stochastic integration and the Ito calculus offering information about stochastic processes, stochastic differential equations, concepts of finance, signal processing, and electrical engineering in various fields. Ita Cirovic Donev in his review for The Mathematical Sciences Digital Library, noted that the author doesn't delve deeply into real-world applications, he instead focuses on demonstrating the practical application of theoretical concepts across various fields.

== Research ==
Kuo has focused his research on subjects of Theory of Stochastic Integration, White Noise Theory and Infinite Dimensional Analysis. He has published several research papers on stochastic differential equations featuring adapted integrands and a range of initial conditions, particularly focusing on their examination within the framework of Itô's theory.

Kuo has conducted research on solving stochastic differential and infinite-dimensional equations within the framework of white noise spaces. In 1990, he explored the Lévy Laplacian operator, denoted as ΔF(ξ), and established two key equivalences establishing a connection between the Lévy Laplacian Δ and the Gross Laplacian ΔGF(ξ) while also discussing an application of these findings in the context of white noise calculus. He conducted research on the S-transform by encompassing the characterization of its range through properties like analyticity and growth, with subsequent applications in white noise analysis extending the Gaussian L2-space. The research also featured examples of the generalized functions and the introduction of new distribution classes marked by bounded growth through iterated exponentials. His research on stochastic differential equations primarily centered on understanding their behavior and exploring potential variations in solutions, exemplified by the introduction of two illustrative scenarios: one demonstrating that a solution can explode in finite time with almost sure certainty, and another showcasing situations where multiple solutions to a stochastic differential equation may coexist.

== Awards and honors ==
- 1998 – NSC Chair Professor of Mathematics, Cheng Kung University
- 2001 – Special Visiting Professor, Hiroshima University
- 2003 – Distinguished Faculty Award, Louisiana State University
- 2004 – CIES Fulbright Lecturing Award, Fulbright Scholar Program
- 2010 – Graduate Training Award, LSU College of Basic Sciences
- 2011 – Fulbright Lecturing Award, Council for International Exchange of Scholars

== Bibliography ==
=== Books ===
- Gaussian Measures in Banach Spaces (1975) ISBN 978-3540071733
- White Noise: An Infinite Dimensional Calculus, co-authored with T. Hida, J. Potthoff and L. Streit (1993) ISBN 978-0-7923-2233-7
- White Noise Distribution Theory (1996) ISBN 978-0-8493-8077-8
- Introduction to Stochastic Integration (2005) ISBN 978-0-387-28720-1

=== Selected articles ===
- Kuo, H. H., Obata, N., & Saitô, K. (1990). Lévy Laplacian of generalized functions on a nuclear space. Journal of Functional Analysis, 94(1), 74-92.
- Kuo, H. H. (1992). Lectures on white noise analysis. Soochow J. Math, 18(3), 229-300.
- Cochran, W. G., Kuo, H. H., & Sengupta, A. (1998). A new class of white noise generalized functions. Infinite Dimensional Analysis, Quantum Probability and Related Topics, 1(01), 43-67.
- Asai, N., Kubo, I., & Kuo, H. H. (2003). Multiplicative renormalization and generating functions I. Taiwanese Journal of Mathematics, 7(1), 89-101.
- Accardi, L., Kuo, H. H., & Stan, A. (2007). Moments and commutators of probability measures. Infinite Dimensional Analysis, Quantum Probability and Related Topics, 10(04), 591-612.
- Kubo, I., Kuo, H. H., & Namli, S. (2007). The characterization of a class of probability measures by multiplicative renormalization. Communications on Stochastic Analysis, 1(3), 8.
- Ayed, W., & Kuo, H. H. (2008). An extension of the Itô integral. Communications on Stochastic Analysis, 2(3), 5.
- Asai, N., Kubo, I., & Kuo, H. H. (2013). The Brenke type generating functions and explicit forms of MRM-triples by means of q-hypergeometric series. Infinite Dimensional Analysis, Quantum Probability and Related Topics, 16(02), 1350010.
- Kuo, H. H., Shrestha, P., & Sinha, S. (2021). An intrinsic proof of an extension of itô’s isometry for anticipating stochastic integrals. Journal of Stochastic Analysis, 2(4), 8.
