= Shoon Kyung Kim =

South Korean theoretical chemist (1920–2003)

- 김순경
- Born: February 29, 1920
- Died: March 14, 2003 (aged 83)
- Education: Osaka University (BS); Yale University (PhD)
- Known for: Group-theoretical methods in chemical physics; founding president of KSEA
- Scientific career
- Fields: Theoretical chemistry
- Workplaces: Seoul National University; Brown University; University of Louisville; Temple University

Shoon Kyung Kim (Korean: 김순경, 29 February 1920 – 14 March 2003) was a South Korean theoretical chemist whose work systematized symmetry and representation theory for molecular and crystalline systems. He held faculty posts at Seoul National University (1951–1965), the University of Louisville (1966–1969), and Temple University (1969–1990). He authored the Cambridge monograph Group Theoretical Methods and Applications to Molecules and Crystals (1999).

Kim was the founding president (1972) of the Korean-American Scientists and Engineers Association (KSEA).

== Education ==
Kim earned a B.S. in chemistry from Osaka University (1944) and a Ph.D. in chemistry from Yale University (1956). At Yale he studied electrolyte theory under Lars Onsager.

== Career ==
After early research posts in Japan and Korea, Kim joined the chemistry faculty at Seoul National University in 1949, serving there until 1965; he was a visiting professor at Brown University (1962–1966). He moved to the University of Louisville (1966–1969) and then to Temple University (1969–1990), later serving as honorary professor until his death in 2003. He organized KSEA in late 1971 and served as its first president in 1972.

== Research and publications ==
Kim worked across statistical dynamics, theoretical chemistry, and chemical physics, publishing more than 70 papers and several books and translations. His Cambridge monograph treats point and space groups (including anti-unitary co-representations) with explicit constructions; it received an independent review in Acta Crystallographica Section A assessing its approach to symmetry and applications in molecular vibrations and band theory. Earlier, Kim introduced a correspondence-theorem method for constructing symmetry-adapted linear combinations (SALCs) and symmetry coordinates.

== Honors ==
Kim was designated a “Person of Distinguished Service to Science and Technology” by the Korean Academy of Science and Technology (KAST). He received major national honors in Korea, including the National Academy of Sciences Award (1961) and the Order of Civil Merit (Camellia, 1972; Rose of Sharon, 1997). For context, the NAS Award is the principal academic prize of Korea’s National Academy of Sciences, and the Order of Civil Merit is a presidential order of five grades, with Mugunghwa (Rose of Sharon) as the highest.

== Legacy ==
KSEA established the “Shoon Kyung Kim Scholarship” (2005) in his memory.

== Selected works ==
- Kim, Shoon K. (1999). Group Theoretical Methods and Applications to Molecules and Crystals. Cambridge University Press. doi:10.1017/CBO9780511534867. ISBN 978-0-521-64062-6.

== Personal life and death ==
Kim died on 14 March 2003; he had been a professor at Temple University for 20 years.
