= Kinetic term =

Aspect of field theory

In quantum field theory, a kinetic term is any term in the Lagrangian that is bilinear in the fields and has at least one derivative. Fields with kinetic terms are dynamical and together with mass terms define a free field theory. Their form is primarily determined by the spin of the fields along with other constraints such as unitarity and Lorentz invariance. Non-standard kinetic terms that break unitarity or are not positive-definite occur, such as when formulating ghost fields, in some models of cosmology, in condensed matter systems, and for non-unitary conformal field theories.

== Overview ==
In a Lagrangian, bilinear field terms are split into two types: those without derivatives and those with derivatives. The former give fields mass and are known as mass terms. The latter, those which have at least one derivative, are known as kinetic terms and these make fields dynamical. A field theory with only bilinear terms is a free field theory. Interacting theories must have additional interacting terms, which have three or more fields per term. In a field theory, the propagators used in Feynman diagrams are acquired from the kinetic and mass terms alone.

The form of the kinetic terms is strongly restricted by the physical requirements and symmetries that the field theory has to satisfy. They have to be hermitian to give a real Lagrangian and positive-definite to avoid negative energy modes and instabilities, and to preserve unitarity. Unitarity can also be broken if kinetic terms have more than two derivatives. They must also be Lorentz invariant in relativistic theories. The particular form of the kinetic term then depends on the Lorentz representation of the fields, which in four dimensions is primarily fixed by the spin. Integer spin fields having two derivatives in their kinetic terms while half-integer spin fields having only one derivative.

When the fields are gauged, the derivatives are replaced by gauge covariant derivatives to make the kinetic terms gauge invariant. When calculating Feynman diagrams, these covariant derivatives are usually expanded to get the bilinear kinetic terms together with a set of interaction terms. Similarly, when a theory is elevated from flat to curved spacetime, the kinetic term derivatives must be replaced by covariant derivatives.

== Canonical kinetic terms by spin ==
The kinetic terms in unitary Lorentz invariant field theories are often expressed in certain canonical forms. In four-dimensional Minkowski spacetime, the kinetic terms primarily depend on the spin of the field, with the kinetic term for a real spin-0 scalar field given by (Note: The metric signature used here is the mostly negative signature. Changing signatures can change the signs of the kinetic terms.)

$$\mathcal L_{0} = \frac{1}{2}\partial_\mu \phi \partial^\mu \phi.$$

A field theory with only this term describes a real massless scalar field. The kinetic term for a complex scalar field is instead given by $\mathcal L_{0} = \partial_\mu \varphi^* \partial^\mu \varphi$, although this can be decomposed into a sum of two real kinetic terms for the real and imaginary components.

Dirac fermion kinetic terms are given by

$$\mathcal L_{1/2} = i \bar \psi \gamma^\mu \partial_\mu \psi.$$

The factor of $i$ is needed to make the kinetic term hermitian, while $\gamma^\mu$ are the gamma matrices, $\psi$ is a Dirac spinor, and $\bar \psi$ is the adjoint spinor. This kinetic term can be decomposed into a sum of left-handed and right-handed Weyl fermions $\mathcal L_{1/2} = i \psi_R^\dagger \sigma^\mu \partial_\mu \psi_R + i \psi^\dagger \bar \sigma^\mu \partial_\mu \psi_L$, where $\sigma^\mu$ and $\bar \sigma^\mu$ are the Pauli four-vectors.

The kinetic term for an abelian gauge field is given in terms of the field strength tensor $F_{\mu\nu} = \partial_\mu A_\nu - \partial_\nu A_\mu$ as

$$\mathcal L_{1} = -\frac{1}{4}F_{\mu\nu}F^{\mu\nu}.$$

The negative sign is necessary to ensure that the $(\partial_0 A^i)^2$ terms are positive to get positive energies. For non-abelian gauge fields the field strength tensor is replaced by a non-abelian field strength tensor $F_{\mu\nu}^a = \partial_\mu A_\nu^a - \partial_\nu A_\mu^a + gf^{abc}A^b_\mu A^c_\nu$, where $f^{abc}$ are the structure constants of the gauge group algebra. These additional terms gives rise to cubic and quartic interaction terms for the gauge bosons.

Spin-3/2 fields, corresponding to gravitinos, have kinetic terms given by

$$\mathcal L_{3/2} = -\frac{1}{2}\bar \psi_\mu \gamma^{\mu\nu\rho}\partial_\nu \psi_\rho.$$

A Lagrangian with only this term describes a massless Rarita–Schwinger field. Here $\gamma^{\mu\nu\rho} = \gamma^{[\mu}\gamma^\nu \gamma^{\rho]}$ are antisymmetric products of gamma matrices.

Spin-2 fields, corresponding to gravitons, have a unique kinetic term given by

$$\mathcal L_{2} = \frac{1}{4}\partial^\mu h^{\nu\rho}\partial_\mu h_{\nu\rho} - \frac{1}{2}\partial^\mu h^{\nu\rho}\partial_\nu h_{\mu\rho} + \frac{1}{2}\partial^\mu h \partial^\nu h_{\nu\mu} - \frac{1}{4}\partial^\mu h\partial_\mu h,$$

where this Lagrangian is known as the Fierz–Pauli Lagrangian. For a massless spin-2 field, this kinetic term can be uniquely extended using the fields gauge symmetry to the Einstein–Hilbert Lagrangian.

One can also write down kinetic terms for fields of spin greater than two. Kinetic terms for massless fields are only compatible with non-interacting theories. Massive higher-spin fields can form interacting effective field theories and are used to describe certain hadrons and some string excitation states in string theory.

In dimensions besides four, other kinetic terms can be written such as those for tensor fields in higher-form gauge theory. Another example is the Chern–Simons kinetic term in 1+2 dimensions, which is a kinetic term for gauge fields of the form $\epsilon^{\mu\nu\rho}A_\mu \partial_\nu A_\rho$. In contrast to the regular kinetic term for gauge fields, this has a single derivative and is a topological term.

== Non-canonical kinetic terms ==
Negative-definite kinetic terms, which have the opposite sign to the canonical kinetic terms, occur in some physical systems. For example, Faddeev–Popov ghost fields occurring in gauge theories either have negative sign kinetic terms or else they have wrong particle statistics, which by the spin-statistics theorem makes them unphysical. Ghost fields also occur in Pauli–Villars regularization where they cancel divergent terms in loop diagrams. In cosmology, certain scalar fields known as phantom fields also have negative kinetic terms. These fields have negative kinetic energy so the dynamics drive the field up a potential towards areas of higher energy. Sometimes non-canonical kinetic terms can be converted to canonical ones through a field redefinition, although this may introduce additional interaction terms. (Note: For example, $s^{-2}\partial_\mu s \partial^\mu s$ is equivalent to $\partial_\mu \phi \partial^\mu \phi$ under the field redefinition $s = e^\phi$.)

Fields without kinetic terms are also important, with these including auxiliary fields, Lagrange multipliers, and background fields, with all of them being non-dynamical. Auxiliary fields have numerous applications such as in off shell formulations of supersymmetric theories where they are used ensure an equal number of bosonic and fermionic degrees of freedom in an off-shell supermultiplet. Lagrange multipliers are used to impose additional constraints or conditions on the other physical fields. Background fields represent some external field that is not solved for in the field theory and so the action is not varied with respect to such fields.

=== Multi-field kinetic terms ===
In a theory with multiple fields of the same type, such as multiple scalars or multiple fermions, their kinetic and mass terms can be grouped together into kinetic and mass matrices. For example, for a set of real scalar fields grouped into a vector $\Phi = (\phi_1, \cdots, \phi_n)$ one can write the kinetic and mass terms as

$$\mathcal L = \frac{1}{2}\Phi_i K_{ij}\Phi_j - \frac{1}{2}\Phi_i M_{ij}\Phi_j,$$

where $K_{ij}$ and $M_{ij}$ must be hermitian and positive-definite. Similar expressions exist for fermions. The kinetic matrix can always be brought into a canonical diagonal form while also diagonalizing the mass matrix. This is achieved by first diagonalizing the kinetic matrix, then rescaling the fields such that all the kinetic terms are canonically normalized, making the matrix proportional to the identity matrix. The mass matrix can then be diagonalized, with this second diagonalization not affecting the kinetic matrix as it is proportional to the identity.

It is not always desirable to diagonalize the kinetic and mass matrices as this may end up mixing up interactions in the full theory. For example, propagation of neutrinos is calculated in the mass basis, which diagonalizes the kinetic and mass matrices. However, the interactions that create neutrinos are written in the flavour basis, which instead diagonalizes the coupling of neutrinos to the W bosons. Calculations for each process are done in each respective basis. The disparity between these two basis gives rise to neutrino oscillations.

Another example occurs when one has two abelian gauge bosons, where such theories often give rise to a kinetic mixing term. This is a term of the form $\epsilon F_{\mu\nu}\tilde F^{\mu\nu}$, (Note: Usually $\epsilon$ is taken to be a small parameter so that kinetic mixing is a perturbative interaction between the two gauge bosons.) which has the effect of converting one gauge boson into another as it propagates. It could be eliminated by diagonalizing the kinetic terms, however this can mix up interactions. Such kinetic mixing is common in the phenomenology of dark photons.

More general kinetic terms can also occur in scalar field theories in the form of non-linear sigma models. In that case the kinetic matrix is replaced by a function of the fields themselves $K_{ij}\rightarrow g_{ij}(\phi)$. In these models, this function behaves as a metric on a manifold, known as a scalar manifold, for which the scalars act as coordinates. A Taylor expansion around the flat metric returns the regular bilinear kinetic terms together with a series of interaction terms. The two-derivative terms in a sigma models with a single scalar field $f(\phi) \partial_\mu \phi \partial^\mu \phi$ can always be put into a canonical form through a field redefinition.

=== Higher-order derivatives ===
Higher-order derivative kinetic terms are bilinear in fields but have more than two derivatives. Such terms generally break perturbative unitarity, giving rise to non-unitary theories. This is because in momentum space, unitarity requires propagators to have an asymptotic falloff of at most $p^{-2}$ in its momentum, corresponding to kinetic terms with at most two derivatives in position space.

Non-unitary theories with higher-order kinetic terms are useful in a number of areas such as in condensed matter physics where unitarity is not a strict requirement. Here they have been used to study elasticity, phase transitions, and certain polymers. These kinetic terms can also help improve the ultraviolet behaviour of Feynman diagrams and turn nonrenormalizable theories into renormalizable ones, such as for higher-derivative gravity. A class of higher-derivative theories known as Lee–Wick models, usually formulate at the S-matrix level, are claimed to be unitary, with them get around the aforementioned obstruction using cutting equations.

When higher-order derivative kinetic terms occur in a Minkowski theory and result in propagators with complex poles, the theory is mathematically inconsistent. This is because these kinetic terms give rise to non-local and non-Hermitian ultraviolet divergences that cannot be eliminated using the standard renormalization procedure. These inconsistencies do not affect higher-derivative theories which do not have propagator complex poles or purely Euclidean theories.

Free higher-derivative scalar field theories are solvable and do not suffer from instabilities such as vacuum decay. They can also be fully conformal. Such non-unitary conformal field theories may be useful for studying the dS/CFT correspondence.
