= Logarithmic Sobolev inequalities =

Class of inequalities

In mathematics, logarithmic Sobolev inequalities are a class of inequalities involving the norm of a function $f$, its logarithm, and its gradient $\nabla f$. These inequalities were discovered and named by Leonard Gross, who established them in dimension-independent form, in the context of constructive quantum field theory. Similar results were discovered by other mathematicians before and many variations on such inequalities are known.

Gross proved the inequality:

$$\int_{\mathbb{R}^n}\big|f(x)\big|^2 \log\big|f(x)\big| \,d\nu(x) \leq \int_{\mathbb{R}^n}\big|\nabla f(x)\big|^2  \,d\nu(x) +\|f\|_{L^2(\nu)}^2\log \|f\|_{L^2(\nu)},$$

where $\|f\|_{L^2(\nu)}$ is the $L^2(\nu)$-norm of $f$, with $\nu$ being standard Gaussian measure on $\mathbb{R}^n.$ Unlike classical Sobolev inequalities, Gross's log-Sobolev inequality does not have any dimension-dependent constant, which makes it applicable in the infinite-dimensional limit.

== Entropy functional ==
Define the entropy functional for a general probability measure $\mu$ (not necessarily the Gaussian measure):
$$\operatorname{Ent}_\mu(f) = \int (f \log f) d\mu - \int f \log \left(\int f d\mu\right) d\mu$$
This is equal to the (unnormalized) KL divergence by $\operatorname{Ent}_\mu(f) = D_{KL}(f d \mu \| (\int f d\mu) d\mu)$.

A probability measure $\mu$ on $\mathbb{R}^n$ is said to satisfy the log-Sobolev inequality with constant $C>0$ if for any smooth function f
$$\operatorname{Ent}_\mu(f^2) \le C\int_{\mathbb{R}^n} \big|\nabla f(x)\big|^2\,d\mu(x).$$
The equivalence with Gross form is immediate after we noticed that $\operatorname{Ent}_\mu(f^2)=2\bigg(\displaystyle\int_{\mathbb{R}^n}|f(x)|^2\log(|f(x)|) d\mu(x) - \|f\|_{L^2(\mu)}^2\,\log\|f\|_{L^2(\mu)} \bigg).$

The presence of a constant $C$ is mandatory in general; the LSI for the standard Gaussian measure is a special case where $C=2$.

== Variants ==
Lemma ((Tao 2012, Lemma 2.1.16))—Let $X_1, \dots, X_n$ be random variables that are independent, complex-valued, and bounded. $F: \mathbf{C}^n \rightarrow \mathbf{R}$ be a smooth convex function. Then

$$\mathbf{E} F(X) e^{F(X)} \leq\left(\mathbf{E} e^{F(X)}\right)\left(\log \mathbf{E} e^{F(X)}\right)+C \mathbf{E} e^{F(X)}|\nabla F(X)|^2$$

for some absolute constant $C$ (independent of $n$).
