= Maria Gordina =

Russian-American mathematician

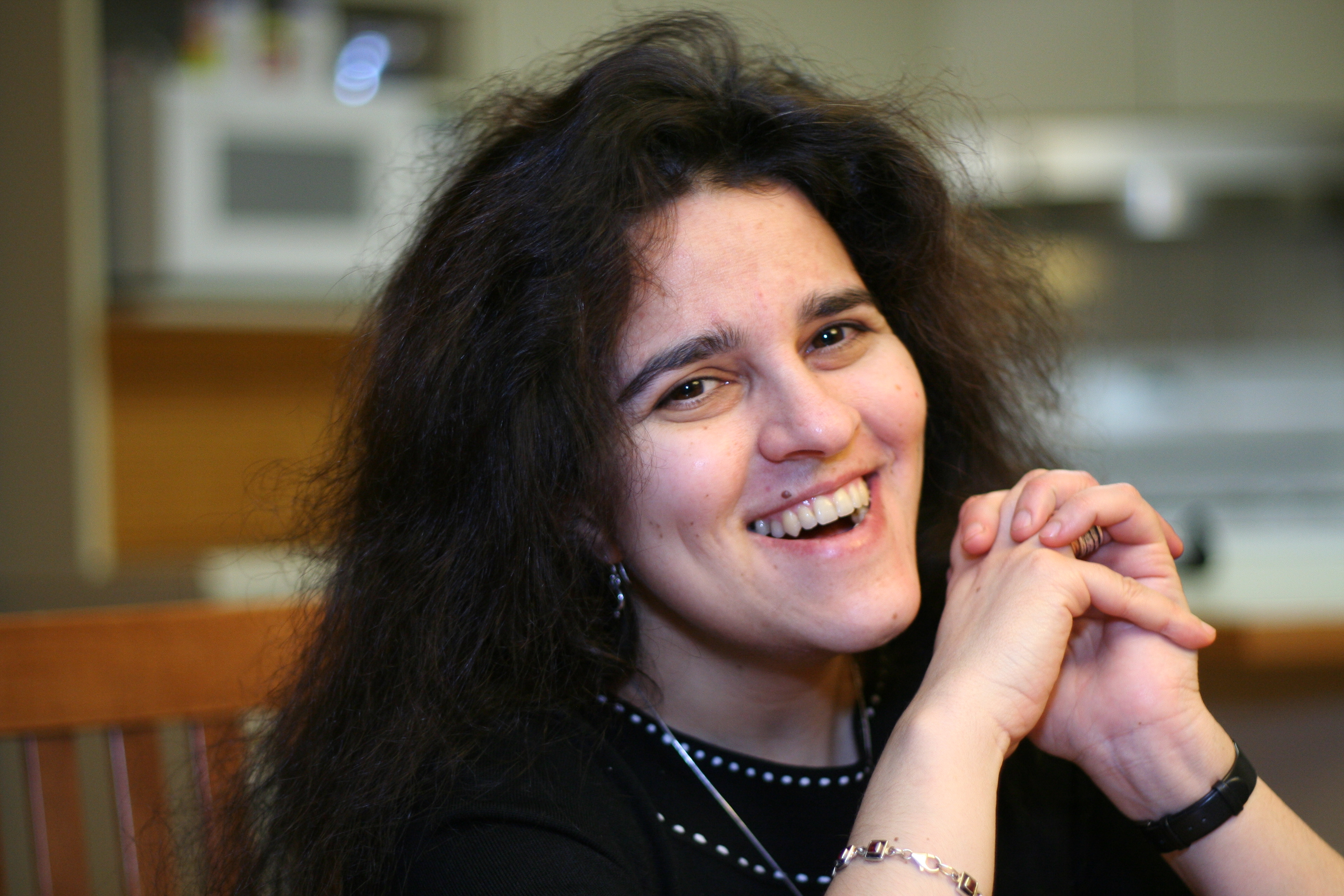
- Gordina in 2007
- Education: Cornell University (Ph.D., 1998)
- Scientific career
- Fields: Mathematics
- Workplaces: University of Connecticut; UC San Diego; McMaster University
- Thesis: Holomorphic Functions and the Heat Kernel Measure on an Infinite Dimensional Complex Orthogonal Group (1998)
- Doctoral advisor: Leonard Gross
- Website: www2.math.uconn.edu/~gordina/

Maria (Masha) Gordina is a Russian-American mathematician. After serving as professor of mathematics at the University of Connecticut for many years, she is currently the John F. Randolph Professor in Mathematics at the University of Rochester and chair of the Department of Mathematics there. Her research is at the interface between stochastic analysis, differential geometry, and functional analysis, including the study of heat kernels on infinite-dimensional groups.

Gordina is the daughter of mathematician Mikhail (Misha) Gordin.

== Education and career ==
Gordina earned a diploma in 1990 from Leningrad State University, and became an assistant professor at the Leningrad Electrotechnical Institute. She completed her doctorate in 1998 from Cornell University; her dissertation, Holomorphic functions and the heat kernel measure on an infinite dimensional complex orthogonal group, was supervised by Leonard Gross. Gordina held a post-doctoral appointment at McMaster University. She was awarded a National Science Foundation postdoctoral fellowship in 2000, and conducted research at the University of California, San Diego. In 2003 Gordina joined the University of Connecticut faculty.

Gordina serves on the editorial boards of Forum Mathematicum, the Electronic Journal of Probability, and Electronic Communications in Probability.

== Honors ==
Gordina was awarded a Humboldt Research fellowship in 2005 (with renewals), and the Ruth I. Michler Memorial Prize of the Association for Women in Mathematics in 2009. She was named a Simons Fellow (2016) in Mathematics and Physical Sciences. She was named to the 2023 class of Fellows of the American Mathematical Society, "for contributions to stochastic and geometric analysis, infinite-dimensional analysis, and ergodicity of hypoelliptic diffusions".

== Selected publications ==
- Baudoin, Fabrice; Feng, Qi; Gordina, Maria Integration by parts and quasi-invariance for the horizontal Wiener measure on foliated compact manifolds. J. Funct. Anal. 277 (2019), no. 5, 1362–1422.
- Banerjee, Sayan; Gordina, Maria; Mariano, Phanuel Coupling in the Heisenberg group and its applications to gradient estimates. Ann. Probab. 46 (2018), no. 6, 3275–3312.
- Eldredge, Nathaniel; Gordina, Maria; Saloff-Coste, Laurent Left-invariant geometries on SU(2) are uniformly doubling. Geom. Funct. Anal. 28 (2018), no. 5, 1321–1367.
- Baudoin, Fabrice; Gordina, Maria; Melcher, Tai. Quasi-invariance for heat kernel measures on sub-Riemannian infinite-dimensional Heisenberg groups. Trans. Amer. Math. Soc. 365 (2013), no. 8, 4313–4350.
- Driver, Bruce K.; Gordina, Maria Heat kernel analysis on infinite-dimensional Heisenberg groups. J. Funct. Anal. 255 (2008), no. 9, 2395–2461.
- Cardetti, Fabiana; Gordina, Maria A note on local controllability on Lie groups. Systems Control Lett. 57 (2008), no. 12, 978–979.
- Gordina, Maria Heat kernel analysis and Cameron-Martin subgroup for infinite dimensional groups. J. Funct. Anal. 171 (2000), no. 1, 192–232.
