= MyNoise =

White noise website and app

- Developer: Dr. Ir. Stéphane Pigeon
- Website: mynoise.net

MyNoise (stylised as myNoise) is a white noise website and app created by Stéphane Pigeon. It offers many different natural soundscapes, as well as synthetic noises such as white noise.

== History ==
MyNoise was created in 2013 by Stéphane Pigeon, a Belgian audio processing engineer, sound designer, and electrical engineer. By April 2016, the website was one of the top 10,000 visited websites in the United States. In 2018, it received a million page views per month. Pigeon personally records soundscapes for the website, such as rainfall, wind, and thunder. Soundscapes can be blended together by users to create a personalised experience. There are also various synthetic noise generators, such as white noise. The app also allows users to conduct a hearing test to optimise the sound generators for their environment. The sound generators are separated into frequencies or specific sounds, allowing users to refine the soundscapes to their tastes.

Development on an Android version of MyNoise began in April 2015, with an early beta becoming available in October of that year and the completed app releasing in January 2017. The app was redesigned during 2023 due to changes to Android; it re-released in December 2023. An iOS app was released in 2014. The mobile versions of MyNoise have some free soundscapes, but offer a bundle of more for $10. The web version is mostly free, but some features can be unlocked with a one-time donation. All donations go towards running the website and app.

In 2020, MyNoise surged in popularity due to the COVID-19 pandemic, with soundscapes such as "Calm Office" being used by people working from home, to replicate the typical sounds of their workplace. The MyNoise mobile app has been used to mask tinnitus symptoms.
