= White noise =

Type of signal in signal processing

The waveform of a Gaussian white noise signal plotted on a graph

In signal processing, white noise is a random signal having equal intensity at different frequencies, giving it a constant power spectral density. The term is used with this or similar meanings in many scientific and technical disciplines, including physics, acoustical engineering, telecommunications, and statistical forecasting. White noise refers to a statistical model for signals and signal sources, not to any specific signal. White noise draws its name from white light, although light that appears white generally does not have a flat power spectral density over the visible band.

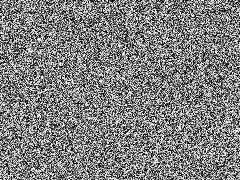
An image of digitally-generated white noise

In discrete time, white noise is a discrete signal whose samples are regarded as a sequence of serially uncorrelated random variables with a mean of zero and a finite variance; a single realization of white noise is a random shock. In some contexts, it is also required that the samples be independent and have identical probability distribution (in other words, independent and identically distributed random variables are the simplest representation of white noise). In particular, if each sample has a normal distribution with zero mean, the signal is said to be additive white Gaussian noise.

The samples of a white noise signal may be sequential in time, or arranged along one or more spatial dimensions. In digital image processing, the pixels of a white noise image are typically arranged in a rectangular grid, and are assumed to be independent random variables with uniform probability distribution over some interval. The concept can be defined also for signals spread over more complicated domains, such as a sphere or a torus.

The sound of white noise, 20-second recording

An infinite-bandwidth white noise signal is a purely theoretical construction. The bandwidth of white noise is limited in practice by the mechanism of noise generation, by the transmission medium and by finite observation capabilities. Thus, random signals are considered white noise if they are observed to have a flat spectrum over the range of frequencies that are relevant to the context. For an audio signal, the relevant range is the band of audible sound frequencies (between 20 and 20,000 Hz). Such a signal is heard by the human ear as a hissing sound, resembling the /h/ sound in a sustained aspiration. On the other hand, the sh sound /ʃ/ in ash is a colored noise because it has a formant structure. In music and acoustics, the term white noise may be used for any signal that has a similar hissing sound.

In the context of phylogenetically based statistical methods, the term white noise can refer to a lack of phylogenetic pattern in comparative data. In nontechnical contexts, it is sometimes used to mean "random talk without meaningful content."

== Statistical properties ==
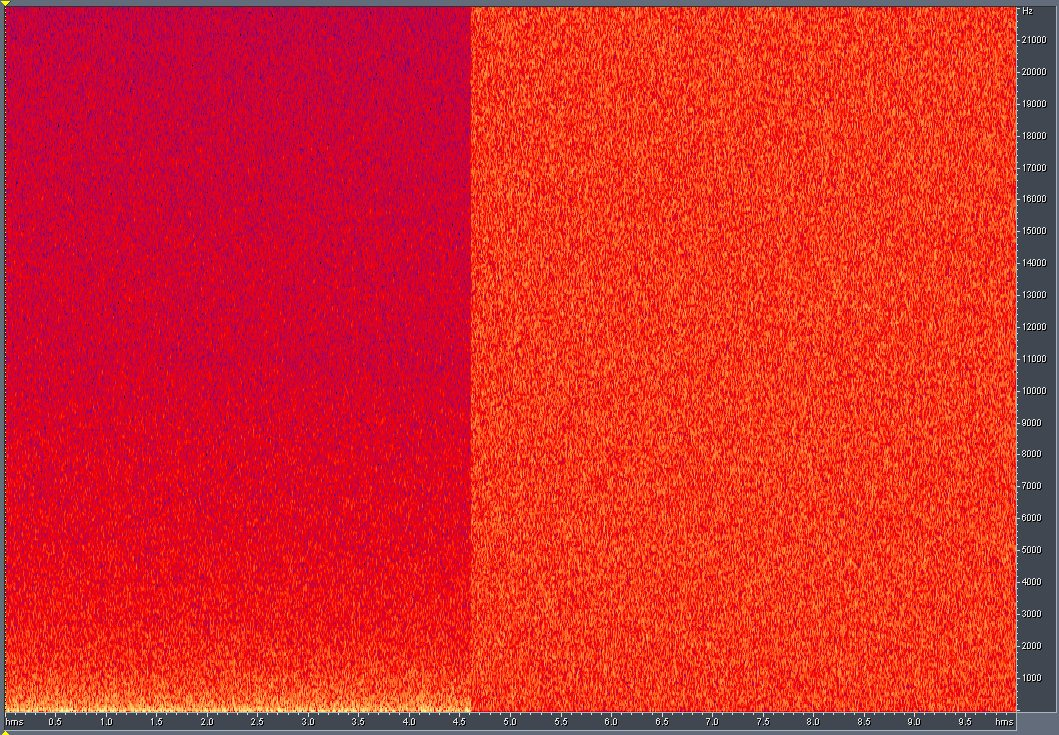
Spectrogram of pink noise (left) and white noise (right), shown with linear frequency axis (vertical) versus time axis (horizontal)

Any distribution of values is possible (although it must have zero DC component). Even a binary signal which can only take on the values 1 or -1 will be white if the sequence is statistically uncorrelated. Noise having a continuous distribution, such as a normal distribution, can of course be white.

It is often incorrectly assumed that Gaussian noise (i.e., noise with a Gaussian amplitude distribution – see normal distribution) necessarily refers to white noise, yet neither property implies the other. Gaussianity refers to the probability distribution with respect to the value, in this context the probability of the signal falling within any particular range of amplitudes, while the term 'white' refers to the way the signal power is distributed (i.e., independently) over time or among frequencies.

One form of white noise is the generalized mean-square derivative of the Wiener process or Brownian motion.

A generalization to random elements on infinite-dimensional spaces, such as random fields, is the white noise measure.

== Practical applications ==
=== Music ===
White noise is commonly used in the production of electronic music, usually either directly or as an input for a filter to create other types of noise signals. It is used extensively in audio synthesis, typically to recreate percussive instruments such as cymbals or snare drums which have high noise content in their frequency domain. A simple example of white noise is a nonexistent radio station (static).

=== Electronics engineering ===
White noise is also used to obtain the impulse response of an electrical circuit, in particular of amplifiers and other audio equipment. It is not used for testing loudspeakers as its spectrum contains too great an amount of high-frequency content. Pink noise, which differs from white noise in that it has equal energy in each octave, is used for testing transducers such as loudspeakers and microphones.

=== Computing ===
White noise is used as the basis of some random number generators. For example, Random.org uses a system of atmospheric antennas to generate random digit patterns from sources that can be well-modeled by white noise.

=== Tinnitus treatment ===
White noise is a common synthetic noise source used for sound masking by a tinnitus masker. White noise machines and other white noise sources are sold as privacy enhancers and sleep aids (see music and sleep) and to mask tinnitus. The Marpac Sleep-Mate was the first domestic use white noise machine built in 1962 by traveling salesman Jim Buckwalter. Alternatively, the use of an AM radio tuned to unused frequencies ("static") is a simpler and more cost-effective source of white noise. However, white noise generated from a common commercial radio receiver tuned to an unused frequency is extremely vulnerable to being contaminated with spurious signals, such as adjacent radio stations, harmonics from non-adjacent radio stations, electrical equipment in the vicinity of the receiving antenna causing interference, or even atmospheric events such as solar flares and especially lightning.

=== Work environment ===
The effects of white noise upon cognitive function are mixed. A small study published in 2007 found that white noise background stimulation improves cognitive functioning among secondary students with attention deficit hyperactivity disorder (ADHD), while decreasing performance of non-ADHD students. Other work indicates it is effective in improving the mood and performance of workers by masking background office noise, but decreases cognitive performance in complex card sorting tasks.

Similarly, an experiment was carried out on sixty-six healthy participants to observe the benefits of using white noise in a learning environment. The experiment involved the participants identifying different images whilst having different sounds in the background. Overall, the experiment showed that white noise does in fact have benefits in relation to learning. The experiment showed that white noise improved the participants' learning abilities and their recognition memory slightly.

== Mathematical definitions ==
=== White noise vector ===
A random vector (that is, a random variable with values in R^{n}) is said to be a white noise vector or white random vector if its components each have a probability distribution with zero mean and a finite variance. While standard signal processing definitions strictly require these variances to be identical to guarantee a perfectly flat power spectrum, broader statistical treatments sometimes only require the variances to be finite and the components to be statistically independent: that is, their joint probability distribution must be the product of the distributions of the individual components.

A necessary (but, in general, not sufficient) condition for statistical independence of two variables is that they be statistically uncorrelated; that is, their covariance is zero. Therefore, the covariance matrix R of the components of a white noise vector w with n elements must be an n by n diagonal matrix, where each diagonal element R_{ii} is the variance of component w_{i}; and the correlation matrix must be the n by n identity matrix. (If the variances are identical, the covariance matrix simplifies to a scalar multiple of the identity matrix, $R = \sigma^2 I$).

If, in addition to being independent, every variable in w also has a normal distribution with zero mean and the same variance $\sigma^2$, w is said to be a Gaussian white noise vector. In that case, the joint distribution of w is a multivariate normal distribution; the independence between the variables then implies that the distribution has spherical symmetry in n-dimensional space. Therefore, any orthogonal transformation of the vector will result in a Gaussian white random vector. In particular, under most types of discrete Fourier transform, such as FFT and Hartley, the transform W of w will be a Gaussian white noise vector, too; that is, the n Fourier coefficients of w will be independent Gaussian variables with zero mean and the same variance $\sigma^2$.

The power spectrum P of a random vector w can be defined as the expected value of the squared modulus of each coefficient of its Fourier transform W, that is, P_{i} = E(|W_{i}|^{2}). Under that definition, a Gaussian white noise vector will have a perfectly flat power spectrum, with P_{i} = σ^{2} for all i.

If w is a white random vector, but not a Gaussian one, its Fourier coefficients W_{i} will not be completely independent of each other; although for large n and common probability distributions the dependencies are very subtle, and their pairwise correlations can be assumed to be zero.

Often the weaker condition statistically uncorrelated is used in the definition of white noise, instead of statistically independent. However, some of the commonly expected properties of white noise (such as a flat power spectrum) may not hold for this weaker version. Under this assumption, the stricter version can be referred to explicitly as independent white noise vector. Other authors use strongly white and weakly white instead.

An example of a random vector that is Gaussian white noise in the weak but not in the strong sense is $x=[x_1,x_2]$ where $x_1$ is a normal random variable with zero mean, and $x_2$ is equal to $+x_1$ or to $-x_1$, with equal probability. These two variables are uncorrelated and individually normally distributed, but they are not jointly normally distributed and are not independent. If $x$ is rotated by 45 degrees, its two components will still be uncorrelated, but their distribution will no longer be normal.

In some situations, one may relax the definition by allowing each component of a white random vector $w$ to have a non-zero expected value $\mu$. In image processing especially, where samples are typically restricted to positive values, one often takes $\mu$ to be one half of the maximum sample value. In that case, the Fourier coefficient $W_0$ corresponding to the zero-frequency component (essentially, the average of the $w_i$) will also have a non-zero expected value $\mu\sqrt{n}$; and the power spectrum $P$ will be flat only over the non-zero frequencies.

=== Discrete-time white noise ===
A discrete-time stochastic process $W(n)$ is a generalization of a random vector with a finite number of components to infinitely many components. A discrete-time stochastic process $W(n)$ is called weak-sense white noise (or often simply "white noise" in signal processing) if its mean is equal to zero for all $n$, i.e., $\operatorname{E}[W(n)] = 0$, and if its autocorrelation function $R_{W}(n) = \operatorname{E}[W(k+n)W(k)]$ has a non-zero value only for $n = 0$, i.e., $R_{W}(n) = \sigma^2 \delta(n)$, where $\sigma^2$ is the variance and $\delta(n)$ is the Kronecker delta.

The variables $W(n)$ are only required to be uncorrelated (not necessarily statistically independent) because the characteristic flat power spectral density of white noise depends entirely on the process's second-order moments (its autocorrelation function). A process that strictly requires the samples to be independent and identically distributed (i.i.d.) is referred to as strict-sense white noise. Notably, if the uncorrelated random variables are jointly Gaussian, this inherently guarantees they are also statistically independent.

=== Continuous-time white noise ===
In order to define the notion of white noise in the theory of continuous-time signals, one must replace the concept of a random vector by a continuous-time random signal; that is, a random process that generates a function $w$ of a real-valued parameter $t$.

Such a process is said to be white noise in the strongest sense if the value $w(t)$ for any time $t$ is a random variable that is statistically independent of its entire history before $t$. A weaker definition requires independence only between the values $w(t_1)$ and $w(t_2)$ at every pair of distinct times $t_1$ and $t_2$. An even weaker definition requires only that such pairs $w(t_1)$ and $w(t_2)$ be uncorrelated. As in the discrete case, some authors adopt the weaker definition for white noise, and use the qualifier independent to refer to either of the stronger definitions. Others use weakly white and strongly white to distinguish between them.

However, a precise definition of these concepts is not trivial, because some quantities that are finite sums in the finite discrete case must be replaced by integrals that may not converge. Indeed, the set of all possible instances of a signal $w$ is no longer a finite-dimensional space $\mathbb{R}^n$, but an infinite-dimensional function space. Moreover, by any definition, a white noise signal $w$ would have to be essentially discontinuous at every point; therefore, even the simplest operations on $w$, like integration over a finite interval, require advanced mathematical machinery.

Some introductory engineering texts treat this as a heuristic rather than a strict mathematical definition, and require each value $w(t)$ to be a real-valued random variable with expectation $\mu$ and some finite variance $\sigma^2$. Then the covariance $\mathrm{E}(w(t_1)\cdot w(t_2))$ between the values at two times $t_1$ and $t_2$ is well-defined: it is zero if the times are distinct, and $\sigma^2$ if they are equal. However, by this definition, the integral

$$W_{[a,a+r]} = \int_a^{a+r} w(t)\, dt$$

over any interval with positive width $r$ would be simply the width times the expectation: $r\mu$. While the expectation being zero is not inherently problematic, if the pointwise variance is finite, the variance of this integral would be zero, meaning the signal has no measurable energy. This property renders the concept inadequate as a model of white noise signals either in a physical or mathematical sense, because a true white noise process must possess a flat power spectral density, which requires the pointwise variance to be infinite rather than finite.

Therefore, most authors define the signal $w$ indirectly by specifying random values for the integrals of $w(t)$ and $|w(t)|^2$ over each interval $[a,a+r]$. In this approach, however, the value of $w(t)$ at an isolated time cannot be defined as a standard real-valued random variable. Also the covariance $\mathrm{E}(w(t_1)\cdot w(t_2))$ becomes infinite when $t_1=t_2$; and the autocovariance function (often loosely referred to as autocorrelation in engineering contexts) $\mathrm{R}(t_1,t_2)$ must be defined as $N \delta(t_1-t_2)$, where $N$ is some real constant representing the power spectral density and $\delta$ is the Dirac delta function, an unbounded measure which correctly reflects the infinite variance at $t_1=t_2$.

In this approach, one usually specifies that the integral $W_I$ of $w(t)$ over an interval $I=[a,b]$ is a real random variable with normal distribution, zero mean, and variance $(b-a)\sigma^2$; and also that the covariance $\mathrm{E}(W_I\cdot W_J)$ of the integrals $W_I$, $W_J$ is $r\sigma^2$, where $r$ is the width of the intersection $I\cap J$ of the two intervals $I,J$. This model is called a Gaussian white noise signal (or process).

In the mathematical field known as white noise analysis, a Gaussian white noise $w$ is defined as a stochastic tempered distribution, i.e., a random variable with values in the space $\mathcal S'(\mathbb R)$ of tempered distributions. Analogous to the case for finite-dimensional random vectors, a probability law on the infinite-dimensional space $\mathcal S'(\mathbb R)$ can be defined via its characteristic function (existence and uniqueness are guaranteed by an extension of the Bochner–Minlos theorem, which goes under the name Bochner–Minlos–Sazanov theorem):

- Analogously to the case of the multivariate normal distribution $X \sim \mathcal N_n (\mu , \Sigma )$, which has characteristic function:

$$\forall k \in \mathbb R^n: \quad \mathrm{E}(\mathrm e^{\mathrm{i} \langle k, X \rangle }) = \mathrm e^{\mathrm i \langle k, \mu \rangle - \frac 1 2 \langle k, \Sigma k \rangle } ,$$

- The white noise $w : \Omega \to \mathcal S'(\mathbb R)$ must satisfy:

$$\forall \varphi \in \mathcal S (\mathbb R) : \quad \mathrm{E}(\mathrm e^{\mathrm{i} \langle w, \varphi \rangle }) = \mathrm e^{- \frac 1 2 \| \varphi \|_2^2},$$

- Where $\langle w, \varphi \rangle$ is the natural pairing of the tempered distribution $w(\omega)$ with the Schwartz function $\varphi$ (i.e. we consider $\varphi$ as a fixed linear function on $\mathcal S'(\mathbb R)$ analogous to $k$ above).
- And $\| \varphi \|_2^2 = \int_{\mathbb R} \vert \varphi (x) \vert^2\,\mathrm d x$.

== Mathematical applications ==
=== Time series analysis and regression ===
In statistics and econometrics one often assumes that an observed series of data values is the sum of the values generated by a deterministic linear process, depending on certain independent (explanatory) variables, and on a series of random noise values. Then regression analysis is used to infer the parameters of the model process from the observed data, e.g. by ordinary least squares, and to test the null hypothesis that each of the parameters is zero against the alternative hypothesis that it is non-zero. Hypothesis testing typically assumes that the noise values are mutually uncorrelated with zero mean and have the same Gaussian probability distribution – in other words, that the noise is Gaussian white (not just white). If there is non-zero correlation between the noise values underlying different observations, then the estimated model parameters are still unbiased, but estimates of their uncertainties (such as confidence intervals) will be biased (not accurate on average). This is also true if the noise is heteroskedastic – that is, if it has different variances for different data points.

Alternatively, in the subset of regression analysis known as time series analysis there are often no explanatory variables other than the past values of the variable being modeled (the dependent variable). In this case the noise process is often modeled as a moving average process, in which the current value of the dependent variable depends on current and past values of a sequential white noise process.

=== Random vector transformations ===
By a suitable linear transformation (a coloring transformation), a white random vector can be used to produce a non-white random vector (that is, a list of random variables) whose elements have a prescribed covariance matrix. Conversely, a random vector with known covariance matrix can be transformed into a white random vector by a suitable whitening transformation.

These two ideas are crucial in applications such as channel estimation and channel equalization in communications and audio. These concepts are also used in data compression.

== Generation ==
White noise may be generated digitally with a digital signal processor, microprocessor, or microcontroller. Generating white noise typically entails feeding an appropriate stream of random numbers to a digital-to-analog converter. The quality of the white noise will depend on the quality of the algorithm used.

== Informal use ==
The term is sometimes used as a colloquialism to describe a backdrop of ambient sound, creating an indistinct or seamless commotion. Some examples include:

- Chatter from multiple conversations within the acoustics of a confined space.
- Continuous, unobtrusive sound used to mask background distractions and aid in relaxation or sleep.
- The pleonastic jargon used by politicians to mask a point that they don't want noticed.
- Music that is disagreeable, harsh, dissonant or discordant with no melody.

The term can also be used metaphorically, as in the novel White Noise (1985) by Don DeLillo, which explores the symptoms of modern culture that came together to make it difficult for an individual to actualize their ideas and personality.

== See also ==
- Bochner–Minlos theorem
- Brownian noise
- Dirac delta function
- Independent component analysis
- MyNoise
- Noise (electronics)
- Noise (video)
- Olfactory white
- Principal component analysis
- Sound masking
