= Ambar Sengupta =

American mathematician (born 1963)

Ambar N. Sengupta
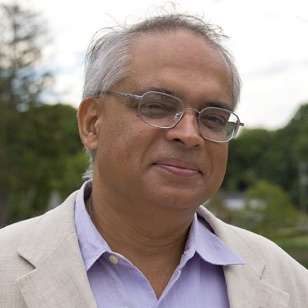
- Sengupta in 2016
- Born: July 20, 1963; Calcutta, India
- Education: Presidency College, Calcutta (BSc, 1984); Cornell University (Ph.D., 1990)
- Scientific career
- Fields: Mathematics; Mathematical physics
- Workplaces: Louisiana State University; University of Connecticut
- Doctoral advisor: Leonard Gross
- Website: math.uconn.edu/person/ambar-sengupta/

Ambar Niel Sengupta is an Indian-American mathematician. He is a professor of mathematics at the University of Connecticut.

== Education and career ==
Ambar Sengupta attended Presidency College, Calcutta and stood first class first in the BSc (Mathematics Honours) examination of the University of Calcutta in 1984. He then joined Cornell University, where he obtained an MS and then a PhD under the supervision of Leonard Gross in 1990.

After a post-doctoral appointment in the Physics Department of Princeton University, he joined Louisiana State University. He became a professor of mathematics in 2003, and he was awarded the Hubert Butts Alumni Professorship in 2011. Sengupta joined the Mathematics faculty of the University of Connecticut as Professor and Head of the Department in 2016.

== Professional activities ==
Sengupta's contributions have been in the fields of pure mathematics, mathematical physics, and financial mathematics.

In quantum field theory, Sengupta gave the first rigorous construction of the Yang-Mills measure for compact surfaces, with or without boundary and for bundles of specified topology. He used this to mathematically prove formulas that had been used in the physics literature and discovered new formulas for non-trivial bundles. He gave a rigorous proof of Edward Witten's formula for the volume of the moduli space of flat connections on a compact oriented surface, and proved that the Yang-Mills measure converges to this limiting measure. He is an initiator of the rigorous study of the large-N limit of Yang-Mills theory in two dimensions. He and Michael Anshelevich showed that the limit of the U(N) Yang-Mills measure for the plane is described by free probability theory, confirming ideas initiated by I. M. Singer. He has published extensively in infinite-dimensional geometry and measure theory, as well as higher gauge theory.

He has served as doctoral advisor or co-advisor to 8 PhD students.

Ambar Sengupta is the founding Managing Editor of the Journal of Stochastic Analysis. He is a Council Member of the New England Statistical Society.

== Awards and honors ==
Ambar Sengupta was awarded a Humboldt fellowship in 1995. He was named a Mercator Fellow by the Deutsche Forschungsgemeinschaft (German Research Foundation) in 2011; he was invited to a visiting professorship at the University of Bonn with this award.

== Selected publications ==
- Gross, Leonard; King, Christopher; Sengupta, Ambar (1989). "Two dimensional Yang-Mills theory via stochastic differential equations". Annals of Physics. 194 (1): 65–112. Bibcode:1989AnPhy.194...65G. doi:10.1016/0003-4916(89)90032-8.
- Sengupta, Ambar (1997). Gauge Theory on Compact Surfaces. American Mathematical Society. ISBN 9780821804841.
- Cochran, W. G.; Kuo, H.-H.; Sengupta, A. (1998). "A New Class of White Noise Generalized Functions". Infinite Dimensional Analysis, Quantum Probability and Related Topics. 1 (1): 43–67. doi:10.1142/S0219025798000053.
- Sengupta, Ambar (2012). Representing Finite Groups: A Semisimple Introduction. Springer. pp. 1–371. ISBN 978-1-4614-1231-1.
- Sengupta, Ambar (2005). Pricing Derivatives. USA: McGraw-Hill. pp. 1–282. ISBN 9780071445887.
