= Itô's theorem =

Math theorem in the field of representation theory

In representation theory, Itô's theorem generalizes the well-known result that the dimension of an irreducible representation of a group must divide the order of that group.

== Statement ==
Given an irreducible representation $V$ of a finite group $G$ and a maximal normal abelian subgroup $A\subseteq G$, the dimension of $V$ must divide $[G:A]$.
