= Corepresentations of unitary and antiunitary groups =

In quantum mechanics, symmetry operations are of importance in giving information about solutions to a system. Typically these operations form a mathematical group, such as the rotation group SO(3) for spherically symmetric potentials. The representation theory of these groups leads to irreducible representations, which for SO(3) gives the angular momentum ket vectors of the system.

Standard representation theory uses linear operators. However, some operators of physical importance such as time reversal are antilinear, and including these in the symmetry group leads to groups including both unitary and antiunitary operators.

This article is about corepresentation theory, the equivalent of representation theory for these groups. It is mainly used in the theoretical study of magnetic structure but is also relevant to particle physics due to CPT symmetry. It gives basic results, the relation to ordinary representation theory and some references to applications.

== Corepresentations of unitary/antiunitary groups ==
Eugene Wigner showed that a symmetry operation S of a Hamiltonian is represented in quantum mechanics either by a unitary operator, S = U, or an antiunitary one, S = UK where U is unitary, and K denotes complex conjugation. Antiunitary operators arise in quantum mechanics due to the time reversal operator

If the set of symmetry operations (both unitary and antiunitary) forms a group, then it is commonly known as a magnetic group and many of these are described in magnetic space groups.

A group of unitary operators may be represented by a group representation. Due to the presence of antiunitary operators this must be replaced by Wigner's corepresentation theory.

=== Definition ===
Let G be a group with a subgroup H of index 2. A corepresentation is a homomorphism into a group of operators over a vector space over the complex numbers where for all u in H the image of u is a linear operator and for all a in the coset G-H the image of a is antilinear (where '*' means complex conjugation):

$$\begin{align}
& \forall u \in H, D(u)(a{\bf x} + b{\bf y}) = a \times D(u){\bf x} + b \times D(u){\bf y} \\
& \forall a \in G-H, D(a)(a{\bf x} + b{\bf y}) = a^* \times D(a){\bf x} + b^* \times D(a){\bf y}
\end{align}$$

=== Properties ===
As this is a homomorphism

$$\begin{align}
& D(u_1u_2) = D(u_1)D(u_2) \\
& D(ua) = D(u)D(a) \\
& D(au) = D(a)D(u)^* \\
& D(a_1a_2) = D(a_1)D(a_2)^*
\end{align}$$

=== Reducibility ===
Two corepresentations are equivalent if there is a matrix V

$$\begin{align}
& \forall u, D'(u) = VD(u)V^{-1} \\
& \forall a, D'(a) = VD(a)V^{*-1}
\end{align}$$

Just like representations, a corepresentation is reducible if there is a proper subspace invariant under the operations of the corepresentation. If the corepresentation is given by matrices, it is reducible if it is equivalent to a corepresentation with each matrix in block diagonal form.

If the corepresentation is not reducible, then it is irreducible.

=== Schur's lemma ===
Schur's lemma for irreducible representations over the complex numbers states that if a matrix commutes with all matrices of the representation then it is a (complex) multiple of the identity matrix, that is, the set of commuting matrices is isomorphic to the complex numbers $\Complex$. The equivalent of Schur's lemma for irreducible corepresentations is that the set of commuting matrices is isomorphic to $\mathbb {R}$, $\Complex$ or the quaternions $\mathbb {Q}$. Using the intertwining number over the real numbers, this may be expressed as an intertwining number of 1, 2 or 4.

=== Relation to representations of the linear subgroup ===
Typically, irreducible corepresentations are related to the irreducible representations of the linear subgroup H. Let $\Delta$ be an irreducible (ordinary) representation of the linear subgroup H. Form the sum over all the antilinear operators of the square of the character of each of these operators:

$$S = \sum_a \chi_\Delta(a^2)$$

and set $P = D(a_0)$ for an arbitrary element $a_0$.

There are three cases, distinguished by the character test eq 7.3.51 of Cracknell and Bradley.

Type(a)
If S = |H| (the intertwining number is one) then D is an irreducible corepresentation of the same dimension as $\Delta$ with
$$\begin{align}
& D(u) = \Delta(u) \\
& D(a) = D(aa_0^{-1}a_0) = \Delta(aa_0^{-1})P
\end{align}$$

Type(b)
S = -|H| (the intertwining number is four) then D is an irreducible representation formed from two 'copies' of $\Delta$
$$\begin{align}
& D(u) = \begin{pmatrix}
\Delta(u) & 0 \\
0 & \Delta(u)
\end{pmatrix} \\
& D(a) = \begin{pmatrix}
0 & \Delta(aa_0^{-1})P \\
-\Delta(aa_0^{-1})P & 0
\end{pmatrix}
\end{align}$$

Type(c)
If S = 0 (the intertwining number is two), then D is an irreducible corepresentation formed from two inequivalent representations $\Delta$ and $\Delta'$ where $\Delta'(u) = \Delta(a_0^{-1}ua_0)^*$
$$\begin{align}
& D(u) = \begin{pmatrix}
\Delta(u) & 0 \\
0 & \Delta(a_0^{-1}ua_0)^*
\end{pmatrix} \\
& D(a) = \begin{pmatrix}
0 & \Delta(aa_0^{-1}) \\
\Delta(a_0^{-1}a)^* & 0
\end{pmatrix}
\end{align}$$

Cracknell and Bradley show how to use these to construct corepresentations for the magnetic point groups, while Cracknell and Wong give more explicit tables for the double magnetic groups.

=== Character theory of corepresentations ===
Standard representation theory for finite groups has a square character table with row and column orthogonality properties. With a slightly different definition of conjugacy classes and use of the intertwining number, a square character table with similar orthogonality properties also exists for the corepresentations of finite magnetic groups.

Based on this character table, a character theory mirroring that of representation theory has been developed.

=== See also ===
- Mock, A. (2016). "Characterization of parity-time symmetry in photonic lattices using Heesh-Shubnikov group theory". Optics Express. 24 (20): 22693–22707. arXiv:1606.05044. Bibcode:2016OExpr..2422693M. doi:10.1364/OE.24.022693. PMID 27828339. S2CID 24476384.
- Schweiser, J. (2005). "Time inversion in the representation analysis of magnetic structures theory". C. R. Physique. 6: 375–384. doi:10.1016/j.crhy.2005.01.009.
- Angeloval, M. N.; Boyle, L. L. (2005). "On the classification and enumeration of the irreducible co-representations of magnetic space groups". Journal of Physics A: Mathematical and General. 29 (5): 993–1010. doi:10.1088/0305-4470/29/5/014.
- Scurek, R. (2004). "Understanding the CPT group in particle physics: Standard and nonstandard representations". Am. J. Phys. 75 (5): 638–643. Bibcode:2004AmJPh..72..638S. doi:10.1119/1.1629087.
