= White noise analysis =

In probability theory, a branch of mathematics, white noise analysis, otherwise known as Hida calculus, is a framework for infinite-dimensional and stochastic calculus, based on the Gaussian white noise probability space, to be compared with Malliavin calculus based on the Wiener process. It was initiated by Takeyuki Hida in his 1975 Carleton Mathematical Lecture Notes.

The term white noise was first used for signals with a flat spectrum.

== White noise measure ==
The white noise probability measure $\mu$ on the space $S'(\mathbb{R})$ of tempered distributions has the characteristic function

$$C(f)=\int_{S'(\mathbb{R})}\exp \left( i\left\langle \omega ,f\right\rangle
\right) \, d\mu (\omega )=\exp \left( -\frac{1}{2}\int_{\mathbb{R}} f^2(t) \, dt\right), \quad f\in S(\mathbb{R}).$$

=== Brownian motion in white noise analysis ===
A version of Wiener's Brownian motion $B(t)$ is obtained by the dual pairing

$$B(t) = \langle \omega, 1\!\!1_{[0,t)}\rangle,$$

where $1\!\!1_{[0,t)}$ is the indicator function of the interval $[0,t)$. Informally

$$B(t)=\int_0^t \omega(t) \, dt$$

and in a generalized sense

$$\omega(t)=\frac{d B(t)}{dt}.$$

== Hilbert space ==
Fundamental to white noise analysis is the Hilbert space

$$(L^2):=L^2\left( S'(\mathbb{R}),\mu \right),$$

generalizing the Hilbert spaces $L^2(\mathbb{R}^n,e^{-\frac{1}{2} x^2}d^n x)$ to infinite dimension.

=== Wick polynomials ===
An orthonormal basis in this Hilbert space, generalizing that of Hermite polynomials, is given by the so-called "Wick", or "normal ordered" polynomials $\left\langle {:\omega^n:} , f_n\right\rangle$ with ${:\omega^n:} \in S'(\mathbb{R}^n)$ and $f_n \in S(\mathbb{R}^n)$

with normalization

$$\int_{S'(\mathbb{R})}\left\langle :\omega^n:,f_n \right\rangle^2 \, d\mu(\omega) = n!\int f_{n}^2(x_1,\ldots,x_n) \, d^n x,$$

entailing the Itô-Segal-Wiener isomorphism of the white noise Hilbert space $(L^2)$ with Fock space:

$$L^2\left( S'(\mathbb{R}),\mu \right) \simeq \bigoplus\limits_{n=0}^\infty \operatorname{Sym} L^2(\mathbb{R}^n,n! \, d^n x).$$

The "chaos expansion"

$$\varphi(\omega) =\sum_n \left\langle :\omega^n:, f_n\right\rangle$$

in terms of Wick polynomials correspond to the expansion in terms of multiple Wiener integrals. Brownian martingales $M_t(\omega)$ are characterized by kernel functions $f_n$ depending on $t$ only a "cut-off":

$$f_n(x_1,\ldots,x_n;t)=
\begin{cases}
f_n (x_1,\ldots,x_n) & \text{if } i x_i\leq t, \\
0 & \text{otherwise}.
\end{cases}$$

=== Gelfand triples ===
Suitable restrictions of the kernel function $\varphi _{n}$ to be smooth and rapidly decreasing in $x$ and $n$ give rise to spaces of white noise test functions $\varphi$, and, by duality, to spaces of generalized functions $\Psi$ of white noise, with

$$\left\langle \! \left\langle \Psi ,\varphi \right\rangle \!\right\rangle
:=\sum_n n!\left\langle \psi_n,\varphi_n \right\rangle$$

generalizing the scalar product in $(L^2)$. Examples are the Hida triple, with

$$\varphi \in (S)\subset (L^2)\subset (S)^\ast \ni \Psi$$

or the more general Kondratiev triples.

== T- and S-transform ==
Using the white noise test functions

$$\varphi_f(\omega ):=\exp \left( i\left\langle \omega ,f\right\rangle \right) \in (S),\quad f \in S(\mathbb{R})$$

one introduces the "T-transform" of white noise distributions $\Psi$ by setting

$$T\Psi (f):=\left\langle \!\left\langle \Psi ,\varphi _{f}\right\rangle
\!\right\rangle .$$

Likewise, using

$$\phi_f(\omega ):=\exp \left( -\frac{1}{2}\int f^2(t) \, dt\right) \exp\left( -\left\langle \omega ,f\right\rangle \right) \in (S)$$

one defines the "S-transform" of white noise distributions $\Psi$ by

$$S\Psi (f):=\left\langle \!\left\langle \Psi ,\phi_f\right\rangle\!
\right\rangle,\quad f \in S(\mathbb{R}).$$

It is worth noting that for generalized functions $\Psi$, with kernels $\psi_n$ as in , the S-transform is just

$$S\Psi (f)=\sum n!\left\langle \psi_n,f^{\otimes n}\right\rangle.$$

Depending on the choice of Gelfand triple, the white noise test functions and distributions are characterized by corresponding growth and analyticity properties of their S- or T-transforms.

=== Characterization theorem ===
The function $G(f)$ is the T-transform of a (unique) Hida distribution $\Psi$ iff for all $f_1,f_2\in S(R),$ the function $z\mapsto G(zf_1+f_2)$ is analytic in the whole complex plane and of second order exponential growth, i.e.
$$\left\vert G(\ f)\right\vert <ae^{bK(f,f)},$$
where $K$ is some continuous quadratic form on $S'(\mathbb{R})\times S'(\mathbb{R})$.

The same is true for S-transforms, and similar characterization theorems hold for the more general Kondratiev distributions.

== Calculus ==
For test functions $\varphi \in (S)$, partial, directional derivatives exist:

$$\partial_\eta \varphi (\omega ):=\lim_{\varepsilon \rightarrow 0}\frac{\varphi (\omega +\varepsilon \eta )-F(\omega )} \varepsilon$$

where $\omega$ may be varied by any generalized function $\eta$. In particular, for the Dirac distribution $\eta =\delta _{t}$ one defines the "Hida derivative", denoting

$$\partial_t \varphi (\omega ):=\lim_{\varepsilon \rightarrow 0} \frac{\varphi(\omega +\varepsilon \delta_t)-F(\omega )} \varepsilon.$$

Gaussian integration by parts yields the dual operator on distribution space

$$\partial_t^\ast =-\partial_t+\omega(t)$$

An infinite-dimensional gradient

$$\nabla :(S)\rightarrow L^2(R,dt) \otimes (S)$$

is given by

$$\nabla F(t,\omega) =\partial_t F(\omega).$$

The Laplacian $\triangle$ ("Laplace–Beltrami operator") with

$$-\triangle =\int dt\;\partial_t^\ast \partial_t \geq 0$$

plays an important role in infinite-dimensional analysis and is the image of the Fock space number operator.

== Stochastic integrals ==
A stochastic integral, the Hitsuda–Skorokhod integral, can be defined for suitable families $\Psi (t)$ of white noise distributions as a Pettis integral

$$\int \partial_t^\ast \Psi (t) \, dt\in (S)^\ast,$$

generalizing the Itô integral beyond adapted integrands.

== Applications ==
In general terms, there are two features of white noise analysis that have been prominent in applications.

First, white noise is a generalized stochastic process with independent values at each time. Hence it plays the role of a generalized system of independent coordinates, in the sense that in various contexts it has been fruitful to express more general processes occurring e.g. in engineering or mathematical finance, in terms of white noise.

Second, the characterization theorem given above allows various heuristic expressions to be identified as generalized functions of white noise. This is particularly effective to attribute a well-defined mathematical meaning to so-called "functional integrals". Feynman integrals in particular have been given rigorous meaning for large classes of quantum dynamical models.

Noncommutative extensions of the theory have grown under the name of quantum white noise, and finally, the rotational invariance of the white noise characteristic function provides a framework for representations of infinite-dimensional rotation groups.
