= Leonard Gross =

American mathematician (born 1931)

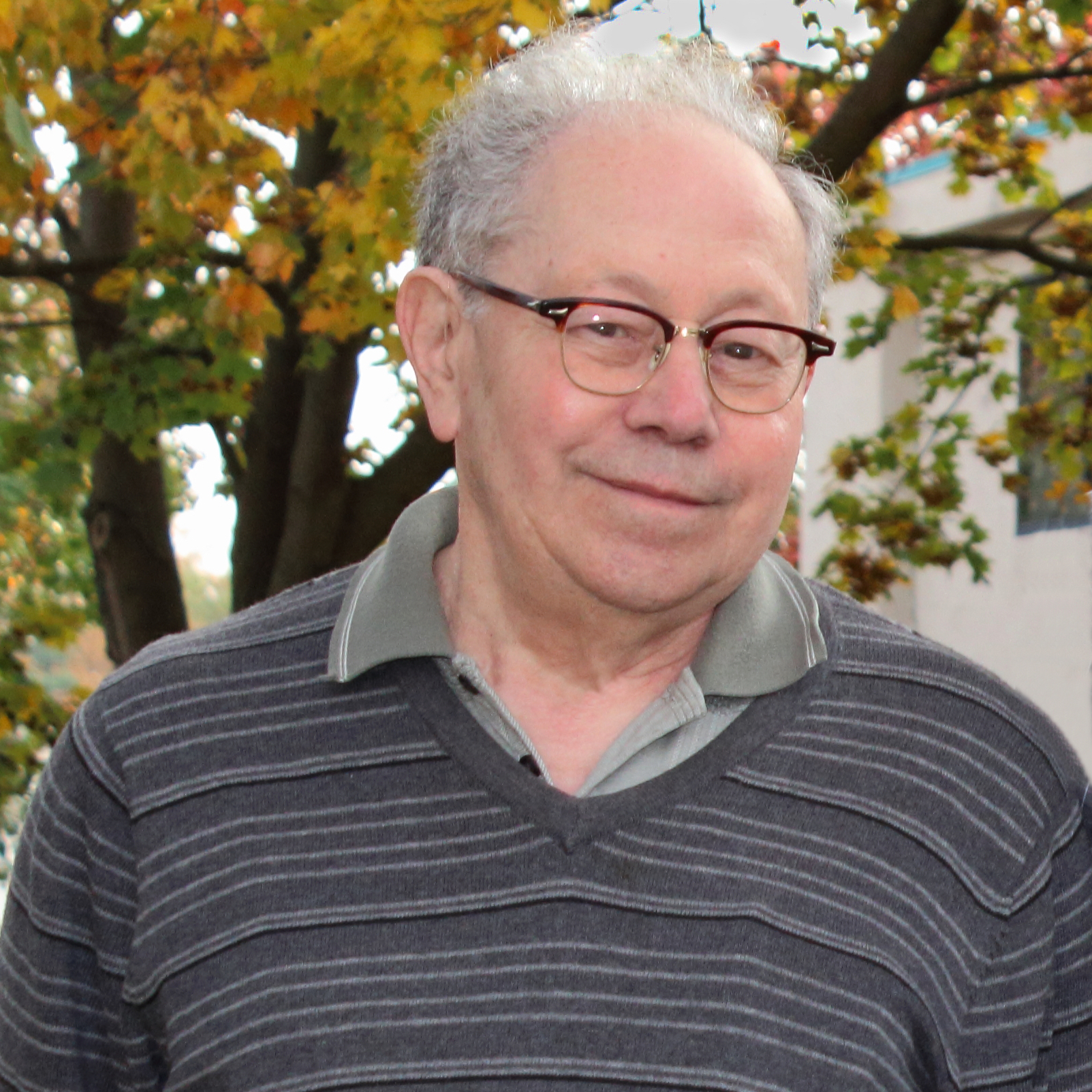
- Gross in 2015
- Born: February 24, 1931 (age 95); Brooklyn, New York City, NY, U.S.
- Education: University of Chicago (MS, PhD)
- Spouse: Grazyna Gross
- Children: 2
- Scientific career
- Fields: Mathematics; Mathematical physics
- Workplaces: Cornell University
- Doctoral advisor: Irving E. Segal
- Doctoral students: Hui-Hsiung Kuo, René Carmona, Bruce K. Driver, Ambar Sengupta, Brian C. Hall, Maria Gordina, Nelia Charalambous, Artem Pulemotov
- Website: math.cornell.edu/leonard-gross

Leonard Gross (born February 24, 1931) is an American mathematician and Professor Emeritus of Mathematics at Cornell University.

Gross has made fundamental contributions to mathematics and the mathematically rigorous study of quantum field theory.

== Education and career ==
Leonard Gross graduated from James Madison High School in December 1948. He was awarded an Emil Schweinberg scholarship that enabled him to attend college. He studied at City College of New York for one term and then studied electrical engineering at Cooper Union for two years. He then transferred to the University of Chicago, where he obtained a master's degree in physics and mathematics (1954) and a Ph.D. in mathematics (1958).

Gross taught at Yale University and was awarded a National Science Foundation Fellowship in 1959. He joined the faculty of the mathematics department of Cornell University in 1960. Gross was a member of the Institute for Advanced Study in 1959 and in 1983 and has held other visiting positions. He has supervised 35 doctoral students.

Gross serves on the editorial boards of the Journal of Functional Analysis, and Potential Analysis.

== Research ==
Gross's scientific work has centered on the mathematically rigorous study of quantum field theories and related mathematical theories such as statistical mechanics. His early works developed the foundations of integration on infinite-dimensional spaces and analytic tools needed for quantum fields corresponding to classical fields described by linear equations. His later works have been devoted to Yang–Mills theory and related mathematical theories such as analysis on loop groups.

=== Abstract Wiener spaces ===
Gross's earliest mathematical works were on integration and harmonic analysis on infinite-dimensional spaces. These ideas, and especially the need for a structure within which potential theory in infinite dimensions could be studied, culminated in Gross's construction of abstract Wiener spaces in 1965. This structure has since become a standard framework for infinite-dimensional integration.

=== Logarithmic Sobolev inequalities ===
Gross was one of the initiators of the study of logarithmic Sobolev inequalities, which he discovered in 1967 for his work in constructive quantum field theory and published later in two foundational papers in which he established these inequalities for the Bosonic and Fermionic cases. The inequalities were named by Gross, who established the inequalities in dimension-independent form, a key feature needed especially in the context of applications to infinite-dimensional settings such as for quantum field theories. Gross's logarithmic Sobolev inequalities proved to be of great significance well beyond their original intended scope of application, for example in the proof of the Poincaré conjecture by Grigori Perelman.

=== Analysis on loop groups and Lie groups ===
Gross has done important work in the study of loop groups, for example proving the Gross ergodicity theorem for the pinned Wiener measure under the action of the smooth loop group. This result led to the construction of a Fock-space decomposition for the $L^2$-space of functions on a compact Lie group with respect to a heat kernel measure. This decomposition then led to many other developments in the study of harmonic analysis on Lie groups in which the Gaussian measure on Euclidean space is replaced by a heat kernel measure.

=== Quantum Yang–Mills theory ===
Yang–Mills theory has been another focus of Gross's works. Since 2013, Gross and Nelia Charalambous have made a deep study of the Yang–Mills heat equation and related questions.

== Honors ==
Gross was a Guggenheim Fellow in 1974–1975. He was elected to the American Academy of Arts and Sciences in 2004 and named a Fellow of the American Mathematical Society in the inaugural class of 2013. He was recipient of the Humboldt Prize in 1996.

== Selected publications ==
- Gross, Leonard: Equivalence of helicity and Euclidean self-duality for gauge fields. Nuclear Phys. B 945 (2019), 114685, 37.
- Charalambous, Nelia; Gross, Leonard: The Yang-Mills heat semigroup on three-manifolds with boundary. Comm. Math. Phys. 317 (2013), no. 3, 727–785.
- Driver, Bruce K.; Gross, Leonard; Saloff-Coste, Laurent: Holomorphic functions and subelliptic heat kernels over Lie groups. J. Eur. Math. Soc. (JEMS) 11 (2009), no. 5, 941–978.
- Gross, Leonard; Malliavin, Paul: Hall's transform and the Segal-Bargmann map. Itô's stochastic calculus and probability theory, 73–116, Springer, Tokyo, 1996.
- Gross, Leonard: Uniqueness of ground states for Schrödinger operators over loop groups. J. Funct. Anal. 112 (1993), no. 2, 373–441.
- Gross, Leonard: Logarithmic Sobolev inequalities on loop groups. J. Funct. Anal. 102 (1991), no. 2, 268–313.
- Gross, Leonard; King, Christopher; Sengupta, Ambar: Two-dimensional Yang-Mills theory via stochastic differential equations. Ann. Physics 194 (1989), no. 1, 65–112.
- Gross, Leonard: A Poincaré lemma for connection forms. J. Funct. Anal. 63 (1985), no. 1, 1–46.
- Gross, Leonard: Logarithmic Sobolev inequalities. Amer. J. Math. 97 (1975), no. 4, 1061–1083.
- Gross, Leonard: Hypercontractivity and logarithmic Sobolev inequalities for the Clifford Dirichlet form. Duke Math. J. 42 (1975), no. 3, 383–396.
- Gross, Leonard: Existence and uniqueness of physical ground states. J. Functional Analysis 10 (1972), 52–109.
- Gross, Leonard: Abstract Wiener spaces. 1967 Proc. Fifth Berkeley Sympos. Math. Statist. and Probability (Berkeley, Calif., 1965/66), Vol. II: Contributions to Probability Theory, Part 1 pp. 31–42 Univ. California Press, Berkeley, Calif.
- Gross, Leonard: Harmonic analysis on Hilbert space. Mem. Amer. Math. Soc. 46 (1963)
