= Infinite Dimensional Analysis, Quantum Probability and Related Topics =

- Discipline: Mathematics, Physics
- Language: English

Publication details
- History: 1988-present
- Publisher: World Scientific
- Frequency: Quarterly
- Impact factor: 0.9 (2022)

Standard abbreviations
- ISO 4: Infin. Dimens. Anal. Quantum Probab. Relat. Top.

Indexing
- ISSN: 0219-0257 (print); 1793-6306 (web)
- LCCN: 98657767
- OCLC no.: 476238792

Links
- Journal homepage; Online archive

Infinite Dimensional Analysis, Quantum Probability and Related Topics is a quarterly peer-reviewed scientific journal published since 1998 by World Scientific. It covers the development of infinite dimensional analysis, quantum probability, and their applications to classical probability and other areas of physics.

== Abstracting and indexing ==
The journal is abstracted and indexed in CompuMath Citation Index, Current Contents/Physical, Chemical & Earth Sciences, Mathematical Reviews, Science Citation Index, Scopus, and Zentralblatt MATH. According to the Journal Citation Reports, the journal has a 2020 impact factor of 0.793.
