= Olfactory white =

Smell composed of strong, diverse smells

Olfactory white is a smell composed of many equally strong but diverse smells, perhaps over 30. To humans, mixtures of many different smells across the perceptual range all tend to smell very similar, despite different components making them up. The concept is similar to all different spectral colours combining to form white. Olfactory white is neither pleasant or malodorous. A nonsense name "laurax" was coined for one of these mixtures.

One example combination of smells that neutralise each other is broccoli, angelica seed oil, cumin, mussles, raw barley, lobster, blackberry brandy, rose wine, vitis, turnip, lamb, Indian dill root, loganberry, elderberry, raw peanut, prawn and citrus.
