= Higher gauge theory =

In mathematical physics, higher gauge theory is the general study of counterparts of gauge theory that involve higher-degree differential forms instead of the traditional connection 1-forms of Yang-Mills gauge theories.

== Frameworks for higher gauge theory ==
There are several distinct frameworks within which higher gauge theories have been developed. Alvarez et al. extend the notion of integrability to higher dimensions in the context of geometric field theories. Several works of John Baez, Urs Schreiber and coauthors have developed higher gauge theories heavily based on category theory. Arthur Parzygnat has a detailed development of this framework. An alternative approach, motivated by the goal of constructing geometry over spaces of paths and higher-dimensional objects, has been developed by Saikat Chatterjee, Amitabha Lahiri, and Ambar N. Sengupta.

The mathematical framework for traditional gauge theory places the gauge potential as a 1-form on a principal bundle over spacetime. Higher gauge theories provide geometric and category-theoretic, especially higher category theoretic, frameworks for field theories that involve multiple higher differential forms.

== See also ==
- Gauge theory
- Introduction to gauge theory
- Gauge group (mathematics)
- Yang–Mills theory
- Yang–Mills equations
