= Classification of discontinuities =

Mathematical analysis of discontinuous points

While continuous functions are important in mathematics, not all functions are continuous. If a function is not continuous at a limit point (also called an "accumulation point" or "cluster point") of its domain, it has a discontinuity there. The set of all points of discontinuity of a function may be a discrete set, a dense set, or even the entire domain of the function.

In elementary real analysis, discontinuities of real functions of one real variable are often distinguished according to the behavior of one-sided limits. While a classification is not entirely standard, a common division is between discontinuities of the first kind, where the relevant one-sided limits exist, and discontinuities of the second kind, where at least one one-sided limit fails to exist or is infinite. Special cases include removable discontinuities and jump discontinuities.

== Classification ==
For each of the following, consider a real valued function $f$ of a real variable $x,$ defined in a neighborhood of the point $x_0$ at which $f$ is discontinuous.

=== Removable discontinuity ===
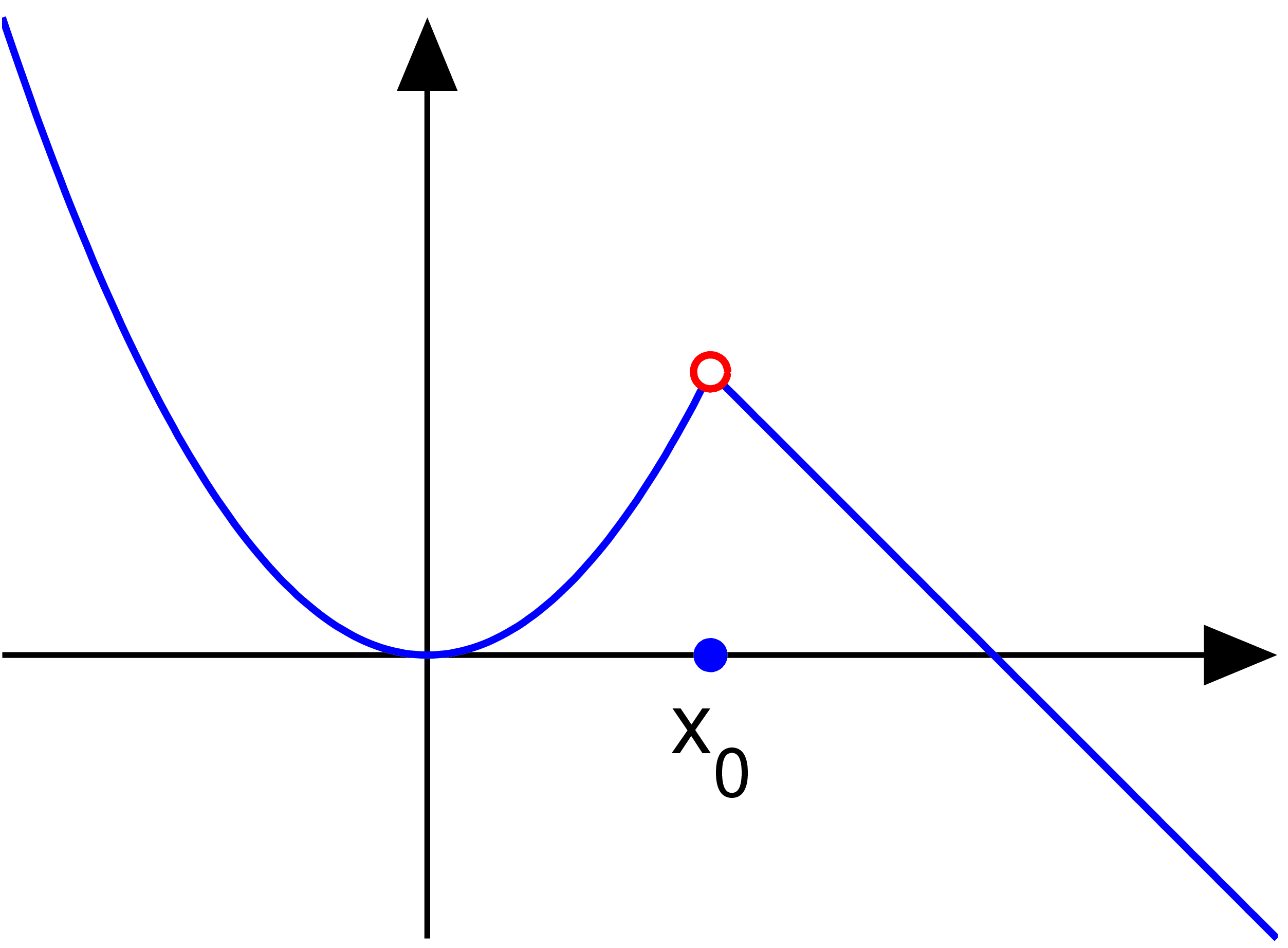
The function in example 1, a removable discontinuity

Consider the piecewise function
$$f(x) = \begin{cases}
x^2 & \text{ for } x < 1 \\
0   & \text{ for } x = 1 \\
2-x & \text{ for } x > 1
\end{cases}$$

The point $x_0 = 1$ is a removable discontinuity. For this kind of discontinuity:

The one-sided limit from the negative direction:
$$L^- = \lim_{x\to x_0^-} f(x)$$
and the one-sided limit from the positive direction:
$$L^+ = \lim_{x\to x_0^+} f(x)$$
at $x_0$ both exist, are finite, and are equal to $L = L^- = L^+.$ In other words, since the two one-sided limits exist and are equal, the limit $L$ of $f(x)$ as $x$ approaches $x_0$ exists and is equal to this same value. If the actual value of $f\left(x_0\right)$ is not equal to $L,$ then $x_0$ is called a removable discontinuity. This discontinuity can be removed to make $f$ continuous at $x_0,$ or more precisely, the function
$$g(x) = \begin{cases}
f(x) & x \neq x_0 \\
L & x = x_0
\end{cases}$$
is continuous at $x = x_0.$

The term removable discontinuity is sometimes broadened to include a removable singularity, in which the limits in both directions exist and are equal, while the function is undefined at the point $x_0.$ (Note: See, for example, the last sentence in the definition given at Mathwords.) This use is an abuse of terminology because continuity and discontinuity of a function are concepts defined only for points in the function's domain.

Removable discontinuities are also sometimes referred to as holes.

=== Jump discontinuity ===
The function in example 2, a jump discontinuity

Consider the function
$$f(x) = \begin{cases}
x^2         & \mbox{ for } x < 1 \\
0 & \mbox{ for } x = 1 \\
2 - (x-1)^2 & \mbox{ for } x > 1
\end{cases}$$

Then, the point $x_0 = 1$ is a jump discontinuity.

In this case, a single limit does not exist because the one-sided limits, $L^-$ and $L^+$ exist and are finite, but are not equal: since, $L^- \neq L^+,$ the limit $L$ does not exist. Then, $x_0$ is called a jump discontinuity, step discontinuity, or discontinuity of the first kind. For this type of discontinuity, the function $f$ may have any value at $x_0.$

=== Essential discontinuity ===
The function in example 3, an essential discontinuity

For an essential discontinuity, at least one of the two one-sided limits does not exist in $\mathbb{R}$. (Notice that one or both one-sided limits can be $\pm\infty$).

Consider the function
$$f(x) = \begin{cases}
\sin\frac{5}{x-1} & \text{ for } x < 1 \\
0                 & \text{ for } x = 1 \\
\frac{1}{x-1}     & \text{ for } x > 1.
\end{cases}$$

Then, the point $x_0 = 1$ is an essential discontinuity.

In this example, both $L^-$ and $L^+$ do not exist in $\mathbb{R}$, thus satisfying the condition of essential discontinuity. So $x_0$ is an essential discontinuity, infinite discontinuity, or discontinuity of the second kind. (This is distinct from an essential singularity, which is often used when studying functions of complex variables).

== Counting discontinuities of a function ==
Supposing that $f$ is a function defined on an interval $I \subseteq \R,$ we will denote by $D$ the set of all discontinuities of $f$ on $I.$ By $R$ we will mean the set of all $x_0\in I$ such that $f$ has a removable discontinuity at $x_0.$ Analogously by $J$ we denote the set constituted by all $x_0\in I$ such that $f$ has a jump discontinuity at $x_0.$ The set of all $x_0\in I$ such that $f$ has an essential discontinuity at $x_0$ will be denoted by $E.$ Of course then $D = R \cup J \cup E.$

The two following properties of the set $D$ are relevant in the literature.

- The set $D$ is an $F_{\sigma}$ set. The set of points at which a function is continuous is always a $G_{\delta}$ set (see).
- If on the interval $I,$ $f$ is monotone then $D$ is at most countable and $D = J.$ This is Froda's theorem.

Tom Apostol follows partially the classification above by considering only removable and jump discontinuities. His objective is to study the discontinuities of monotone functions, mainly to prove Froda’s theorem. With the same purpose, Walter Rudin and Karl R. Stromberg study also removable and jump discontinuities by using different terminologies. However, furtherly, both authors state that $R \cup J$ is always a countable set (see).

The term essential discontinuity has evidence of use in mathematical context as early as 1889. However, the earliest use of the term alongside a mathematical definition seems to have been given in the work by John Klippert. Therein, Klippert also classified essential discontinuities themselves by subdividing the set $E$ into the three following sets:

$$\begin{align}
E_1 &= \Bigl\{x_0\in I : \lim_{x\to x_0^-} f(x) \text{ and } \lim_{x\to x_0^+} f(x) \text{ do not exist in }\mathbb{R} \Bigr\}, \\[5pt]
E_2 &= \Bigl\{x_0\in I : \ \lim_{x\to x_0^-} f(x) \text{ exists in } \mathbb{R}\text { and } \lim_{x\to x_0^+} f(x) \text{ does not exist in } \mathbb{R}\Bigr\}, \\[5pt]
E_3 &= \Bigl\{x_0\in I : \ \lim_{x\to x_0^-} f(x) \text{ does not exist in } \mathbb{R}\text { and } \lim_{x\to x_0^+} f(x) \text{ exists in }\mathbb{R}\Bigr\}.
\end{align}$$

Of course $E=E_1 \cup E_2 \cup E_3.$ Whenever $x_0\in E_1,$ $x_0$ is called an essential discontinuity of first kind. Any $x_0 \in E_2 \cup E_3$ is said an essential discontinuity of second kind. Hence he enlarges the set $R \cup J$ without losing its characteristic of being countable, by stating the following:

- The set $R \cup J \cup E_2 \cup E_3$ is countable.

== Rewriting Lebesgue's theorem ==
When $I=[a,b]$ and $f$ is a bounded function, it is well-known of the importance of the set $D$ in the regard of the Riemann integrability of $f.$ In fact, Lebesgue's theorem (also named Lebesgue-Vitali theorem) states that $f$ is Riemann integrable on $I = [a,b]$ if and only if $D$ is a set with Lebesgue's measure zero.

In this theorem seems that all type of discontinuities have the same weight on the obstruction that a bounded function $f$ be Riemann integrable on $[a,b].$ Since countable sets are sets of Lebesgue's measure zero and a countable union of sets with Lebesgue's measure zero is still a set of Lebesgue's measure zero, we are seeing now that this is not the case. In fact, the discontinuities in the set $R \cup J \cup E_2 \cup E_3$ are absolutely neutral in the regard of the Riemann integrability of $f.$ The main discontinuities for that purpose are the essential discontinuities of first kind and consequently the Lebesgue-Vitali theorem can be rewritten as follows:

- A bounded function, $f,$ is Riemann integrable on $[a,b]$ if and only if the correspondent set $E_1$ of all essential discontinuities of first kind of $f$ has Lebesgue's measure zero.

The case where $E_1 = \varnothing$ correspond to the following well-known classical complementary situations of Riemann integrability of a bounded function $f : [a, b] \to \R$:

- If $f$ has right-hand limit at each point of $[a, b[$ then $f$ is Riemann integrable on $[a, b]$ (see)
- If $f$ has left-hand limit at each point of $]a, b]$ then $f$ is Riemann integrable on $[a, b].$
- If $f$ is a regulated function on $[a, b]$ then $f$ is Riemann integrable on $[a, b].$

=== Examples ===
Thomae's function is discontinuous at every non-zero rational point, but continuous at every irrational point. One easily sees that those discontinuities are all removable. By the first paragraph, there does not exist a function that is continuous at every rational point, but discontinuous at every irrational point.

The indicator function of the rationals, also known as the Dirichlet function, is discontinuous everywhere. These discontinuities are all essential of the first kind too.

Consider now the ternary Cantor set $\mathcal{C} \subset [0,1]$ and its indicator (or characteristic) function
$$\mathbf 1_\mathcal{C}(x) = \begin{cases}
1 & x \in \mathcal{C} \\
0 & x \in [0,1] \setminus \mathcal{C}.
\end{cases}$$
One way to construct the Cantor set $\mathcal{C}$ is given by $\mathcal{C} := \bigcap_{n=0}^\infty C_n$ where the sets $C_n$ are obtained by recurrence according to
$$C_n = \frac{C_{n-1}} 3 \cup \left(\frac 2 {3} + \frac{C_{n-1}} 3\right) \text{ for } n \geq 1, \text{ and } C_0 = [0, 1].$$

In view of the discontinuities of the function $\mathbf 1_\mathcal{C}(x),$ let's assume a point $x_0\not\in\mathcal{C}.$

Therefore there exists a set $C_n,$ used in the formulation of $\mathcal{C}$, which does not contain $x_0.$ That is, $x_0$ belongs to one of the open intervals which were removed in the construction of $C_n.$ This way, $x_0$ has a neighbourhood with no points of $\mathcal{C}.$ (In another way, the same conclusion follows taking into account that $\mathcal{C}$ is a closed set and so its complementary with respect to $[0, 1]$ is open). Therefore $\mathbf 1_\mathcal{C}$ only assumes the value zero in some neighbourhood of $x_0.$ Hence $\mathbf 1_\mathcal{C}$ is continuous at $x_0.$

This means that the set $D$ of all discontinuities of $\mathbf 1_\mathcal{C}$ on the interval $[0, 1]$ is a subset of $\mathcal{C}.$ Since $\mathcal{C}$ is an uncountable set with null Lebesgue measure, also $D$ is a null Lebesgue measure set and so in the regard of Lebesgue-Vitali theorem $\mathbf 1_\mathcal{C}$ is a Riemann integrable function.

More precisely one has $D = \mathcal{C}.$ In fact, since $\mathcal{C}$ is a nonwhere dense set, if $x_0\in\mathcal{C}$ then no neighbourhood $\left(x_0-\varepsilon, x_0+\varepsilon\right)$ of $x_0,$ can be contained in $\mathcal{C}.$ This way, any neighbourhood of $x_0\in\mathcal{C}$ contains points of $\mathcal{C}$ and points which are not of $\mathcal{C}.$ In terms of the function $\mathbf 1_\mathcal{C}$ this means that both $\lim_{x\to x_0^-} \mathbf 1_\mathcal{C}(x)$ and $\lim_{x\to x_0^+} 1_\mathcal{C}(x)$ do not exist. That is, $D = E_1,$ where by $E_1,$ as before, we denote the set of all essential discontinuities of first kind of the function $\mathbf 1_\mathcal{C}.$ Clearly $\int_0^1 \mathbf 1_\mathcal{C}(x)dx = 0.$

== Discontinuities of derivatives ==
Let $I \subseteq \R$ an open interval, let $F:I\to\mathbb{R}$ be differentiable on $I,$ and let $f:I\to\mathbb{R}$ be the derivative of $F.$ That is, $F'(x)=f(x)$ for every $x\in I$. According to Darboux's theorem, the derivative function $f: I \to \Reals$ satisfies the intermediate value property. The function $f$ can, of course, be continuous on the interval $I,$ in which case Bolzano's theorem also applies. Recall that Bolzano's theorem asserts that every continuous function satisfies the intermediate value property. On the other hand, the converse is false: Darboux's theorem does not assume $f$ to be continuous and the intermediate value property does not imply $f$ is continuous on $I.$

Darboux's theorem does, however, have an immediate consequence on the type of discontinuities that $f$ can have. In fact, if $x_0\in I$ is a point of discontinuity of $f$, then necessarily $x_0$ is an essential discontinuity of $f$. This means in particular that the following two situations cannot occur:

1. $x_0$ is a removable discontinuity of $f$.
2. $x_0$ is a jump discontinuity of $f$.

Furthermore, two other situations have to be excluded (see John Klippert):

3. $\lim_{x\to x_0^-} f(x)=\pm\infty.$
4. $\lim_{x\to x_0^+} f(x)=\pm\infty.$

Observe that whenever one of the conditions (i), (ii), (iii), or (iv) is fulfilled for some $x_0\in I$ one can conclude that $f$ fails to possess an antiderivative, $F$, on the interval $I$.

On the other hand, a new type of discontinuity with respect to any function $f:I\to\mathbb{R}$ can be introduced: an essential discontinuity, $x_0 \in I$, of the function $f$, is said to be a fundamental essential discontinuity of $f$ if

$$\lim_{x\to x_0^-} f(x)\neq\pm\infty$$
and
$$\lim_{x\to x_0^+} f(x)\neq\pm\infty.$$

Therefore if $x_0\in I$ is a discontinuity of a derivative function $f:I\to\mathbb{R}$, then necessarily $x_0$ is a fundamental essential discontinuity of $f$.

Notice also that when $I=[a,b]$ and $f:I\to\mathbb{R}$ is a bounded function, as in the assumptions of Lebesgue's theorem, we have for all $x_0\in (a,b)$:
$$\lim_{x\to x_0^\pm} f(x)\neq\pm\infty ,$$
$$\lim_{x\to a^+} f(x)\neq\pm\infty,$$
and
$$\lim_{x\to b^-} f(x)\neq\pm\infty.$$
Therefore any essential discontinuity of $f$ is a fundamental one.

== See also ==
- Removable singularity – Undefined point on a holomorphic function which can be made regular
- Mathematical singularity – Point where a mathematical object behaves irregularly
- Extension by continuity – Property of topological space
- Smoothness – Degree of differentiability of a function or map
  - Geometric continuity – Degree of differentiability of a function or map
  - Parametric continuity – Notion of smoothness for parametric curves

== Sources ==
- Malik, S.C.; Arora, Savita (1992). Mathematical Analysis (2nd ed.). New York: Wiley. ISBN 0-470-21858-4.
