= Regulated integral =

Definition of integral for regulated functions

In mathematics, the regulated integral is a definition of integration for regulated functions, which are defined to be uniform limits of step functions. The use of the regulated integral instead of the Riemann integral has been advocated by Nicolas Bourbaki and Jean Dieudonné.

== Definition ==
=== Definition on step functions ===
Let [a, b] be a fixed closed, bounded interval in the real line R. A real-valued function φ : [a, b] → R is called a step function if there exists a finite partition

$$\Pi = \{ a = t_0 < t_1 < \cdots < t_k = b \}$$

of [a, b] such that φ is constant on each open interval (t_{i}, t_{i+1}) of Π; suppose that this constant value is c_{i} ∈ R. Then, define the integral of a step function φ to be

$$\int_a^b \varphi(t) \, \mathrm{d} t := \sum_{i = 0}^{k - 1} c_i | t_{i + 1} - t_i |.$$

It can be shown that this definition is independent of the choice of partition, in that if Π_{1} is another partition of [a, b] such that φ is constant on the open intervals of Π_{1}, then the numerical value of the integral of φ is the same for Π_{1} as for Π.

=== Extension to regulated functions ===
A function f : [a, b] → R is called a regulated function if it is the uniform limit of a sequence of step functions on [a, b]:

- there is a sequence of step functions (φ_{n})_{n∈N} such that || φ_{n} − f ||_{∞} → 0 as n → ∞; or, equivalently,
- for all ε > 0, there exists a step function φ_{ε} such that || φ_{ε} − f ||_{∞} < ε; or, equivalently,
- f lies in the closure of the space of step functions, where the closure is taken in the space of all bounded functions [a, b] → R and with respect to the supremum norm || ⋅ ||_{∞}; or equivalently,
- for every t ∈ [a, b), the right-sided limit
  $$f(t+) = \lim_{s \downarrow t} f(s)$$
  exists, and, for every t ∈ (a, b], the left-sided limit
  $$f(t-) = \lim_{s \uparrow t} f(s)$$
  exists as well.

Define the integral of a regulated function f to be

$$\int_{a}^{b} f(t) \, \mathrm{d} t :=
\lim_{n \to \infty} \int_{a}^{b} \varphi_{n} (t) \, \mathrm{d} t,$$

where (φ_{n})_{n∈N} is any sequence of step functions that converges uniformly to f.

One must check that this limit exists and is independent of the chosen sequence, but this is an immediate consequence of the continuous linear extension theorem of elementary functional analysis: a bounded linear operator T_{0} defined on a dense linear subspace E_{0} of a normed linear space E and taking values in a Banach space F extends uniquely to a bounded linear operator T : E → F with the same (finite) operator norm.

== Properties of the regulated integral ==
- The integral is a linear operator: for any regulated functions f and g and constants α and β,
  $$\int_{a}^{b} \alpha f(t) + \beta g(t) \, \mathrm{d} t
= \alpha \int_{a}^{b} f(t) \, \mathrm{d} t + \beta \int_{a}^{b} g(t) \, \mathrm{d} t.$$
- The integral is also a bounded operator: every regulated function f is bounded, and if m ≤ f(t) ≤ M for all t ∈ [a, b], then
  $$m | b - a | \leq \int_{a}^{b} f(t) \, \mathrm{d} t \leq M | b - a |.$$
  In particular:
  $$\left| \int_{a}^{b} f(t) \, \mathrm{d} t \right| \leq \int_{a}^{b} | f(t) | \, \mathrm{d} t.$$
- Since step functions are integrable and the integrability and the value of a Riemann integral are compatible with uniform limits, the regulated integral is a special case of the Riemann integral.

== Extension to functions defined on the whole real line ==
It is possible to extend the definitions of step function and regulated function and the associated integrals to functions defined on the whole real line. However, care must be taken with certain technical points:

- the partition on whose open intervals a step function is required to be constant is allowed to be a countable set, but must be a discrete set, i.e. have no limit points;
- the requirement of uniform convergence must be loosened to the requirement of uniform convergence on compact sets, i.e. closed and bounded intervals;
- not every bounded function is integrable (e.g. the function with constant value 1). This leads to a notion of local integrability.

== Extension to vector-valued functions ==
The above definitions go through mutatis mutandis in the case of functions taking values in a Banach space X.

== See also ==
- Lebesgue integral
- Riemann integral
