= List of types of sets =

Sets can be classified according to the properties they have.

== Relative to set theory ==
- Empty set
- Finite set, Infinite set
- Countable set, Uncountable set
- Power set

== Relative to a topology ==
- Closed set
- Open set
- Clopen set
- F_{σ} set
- G_{δ} set
- Compact set
- Relatively compact set
- Regular open set, regular closed set
- Connected set
- Perfect set
- Meagre set
- Nowhere dense set

== Relative to a metric ==
- Bounded set
- Totally bounded set

== Relative to measurability ==
- Borel set
- Baire set
- Measurable set, Non-measurable set
- Universally measurable set

== Relative to a measure ==
- Negligible set
- Null set
- Haar null set

== In a linear space ==
- Convex set
- Balanced set, Absolutely convex set

== Relative to the real/complex numbers ==
- Fractal set

== Ways of defining sets/Relation to descriptive set theory ==
- Recursive set
- Recursively enumerable set
- Arithmetical set
- Diophantine set
- Hyperarithmetical set
- Analytical set
- Analytic set, Coanalytic set
- Suslin set
- Projective set
- Inhabited set

== More general objects still called sets ==
- Multiset

== See also ==
- List of set identities and relations – Equalities for combinations of sets
- List of types of functions
