= Darboux's theorem (analysis) =

All derivatives have the intermediate value property

In real analysis, Darboux's theorem states that the derivative of any real-valued function of a real variable has the intermediate value property, that is, that the image of an interval is also an interval.

When $f$ is continuously differentiable, this is a consequence of the intermediate value theorem. But even when $f'$ is not continuous, Darboux's theorem places a restriction on the behaviour of $f'$ over any closed interval.

== Statement of the theorem ==
Let $I$ be an open interval, and let $f\colon I\to \R$ be a real-valued differentiable function. Then $f'$ has the intermediate value property: If $a$ and $b$ are points in $I$ with $a<b$, then for every $y$ between $f'(a)$ and $f'(b)$, there exists an $x$ in $[a,b]$ such that $f'(x)=y$.

The original proof by Jean Gaston Darboux was published in 1875.

== Proofs ==
=== Proof from the extreme value theorem ===
The first proof is based on the extreme value theorem.

If $y$ equals $f'(a)$ or $f'(b)$, then setting $x$ equal to $a$ or $b$, respectively, gives the desired result. Now assume that $y$ is strictly between $f'(a)$ and $f'(b)$, and in particular that $f'(a)>y>f'(b)$. Let $\varphi\colon I\to \R$ such that $\varphi(t)=f(t)-yt$. If it is the case that $f'(a)<y<f'(b)$ we adjust our below proof, instead asserting that $\varphi$ has its minimum on $[a,b]$.

Since $\varphi$ is continuous on the closed interval $[a,b]$, the maximum value of $\varphi$ on $[a,b]$ is attained at some point in $[a,b]$, according to the extreme value theorem.

Because $\varphi'(a)=f'(a)-y> 0$, we know $\varphi$ cannot attain its maximum value at $a$. (If it did, then $(\varphi(t)-\varphi(a))/(t-a) \leq 0$ for all $t \in (a,b]$, which implies $\varphi'(a) \leq 0$.)

Likewise, because $\varphi'(b)=f'(b)-y<0$, we know $\varphi$ cannot attain its maximum value at $b$.

Therefore, $\varphi$ must attain its maximum value at some point $x\in(a,b)$. Hence, by Fermat's theorem, $\varphi'(x)=0$, i.e. $f'(x)=y$.

=== Proof from the mean and intermediate value theorems ===
The second proof is based on combining the mean value theorem and the intermediate value theorem.

Define $c = \frac{1}{2} (a + b)$. For $a \leq t \leq c,$ define $\alpha (t) = a$ and $\beta (t) = 2t - a$. And for $c \leq t \leq b,$ define $\alpha (t) = 2t - b$ and $\beta(t) = b$.

Thus, for $t \in (a,b)$ we have $a \leq \alpha (t) < \beta (t) \leq b$. Now, define $g(t) = \frac{(f \circ \beta)(t) - (f \circ \alpha)(t)}{\beta(t) - \alpha(t)}$ with $a < t < b$. $\, g$ is continuous in $(a, b)$.

Furthermore, $g(t) \rightarrow {f}' (a)$ when $t \rightarrow a$ and $g(t) \rightarrow {f}' (b)$ when $t \rightarrow b$; therefore, from the Intermediate Value Theorem, if $y \in ({f}' (a), {f}' (b))$ then, there exists $t_0 \in (a, b)$ such that $g(t_0) = y$. Let's fix $t_0$.

From the Mean Value Theorem, there exists a point $x \in (\alpha (t_0), \beta (t_0))$ such that ${f}'(x) = g(t_0)$. Hence, ${f}' (x) = y$.

== Darboux function ==
A Darboux function is a real-valued function $f$ which has the "intermediate value property": for any two values $a$ and $b$ in the domain of $f$, and any $y$ between $f(a)$ and $f(b)$, there is some $c$ between $a$ and $b$ with $y=f(c)$. By the intermediate value theorem, every continuous function on a real interval is a Darboux function. Darboux's contribution was to show that there are discontinuous Darboux functions.

Every discontinuity of a Darboux function is essential, that is, at any point of discontinuity, at least one of the left hand and right hand limits does not exist.

An example of a Darboux function that is discontinuous at one point is the topologist's sine curve function:
$$x \mapsto \begin{cases}\sin(1/x) & \text{for } x\ne 0, \\ 0 &\text{for } x=0. \end{cases}$$

By Darboux's theorem, the derivative of any differentiable function is a Darboux function. In particular, the derivative of the function $x \mapsto x^2\sin(1/x)$ is a Darboux function even though it is not continuous at one point.

An example of a Darboux function that is nowhere continuous is Conway's base 13 function. Another is Bergfeldt's function where a real number x is written in expanded in binary with digits $(x_i)_{i\in\mathbb Z_+}$ each 0 or 1, and $f(x)=\sum\limits_{k=1}^\infty \frac{(-1)^{x_k}}{k}$ if the series converges for that x and 0 if it does not.

Darboux functions are a quite general class of functions. It turns out that any real-valued function on the real line can be written as the sum of two Darboux functions. This implies in particular that the class of Darboux functions is not closed under addition.

A strongly Darboux function is one for which the image of every (non-empty) open interval is the whole real line.

== Further restrictions on derivatives ==
Darboux's theorem gives a necessary condition for a function to be a derivative, but it is not sufficient. Every derivative of a real function is also of Baire class one, and the set of points at which a derivative is discontinuous is a meagre $F_\sigma$ set. Conversely, every meagre $F_\sigma$ subset of the real line can occur as the discontinuity set of a derivative.

A finer restriction is on the sublevel sets of a derivative. For a real function $f$, its associated superlevel and sublevel sets are $\{x:f(x)>a\}$ and $\{x:f(x)<a\}$, where $a$ is real. Zahorski introduced classes $M_0,\ldots,M_5$ of sets describing how large such associated sets must be near their own points. In this terminology, one has the following theorems:

- Every finite derivative has associated sets in $M_3$.
- Every bounded derivative has associated sets in $M_4$. Moreover, a set is an associated set of some bounded derivative if and only if it belongs to $M_4$.

Intuitively, if $f=F'$ and $f(x_0)>a$, then the set on which $f>a$ cannot be arbitrarily sparse near $x_0$. If $f$ is continuous at $x_0$, this is trivial: $f>a$ throughout some neighbourhood of $x_0$, so the local density is $1$. The Zahorski conditions express weaker density requirements that remain valid even when the derivative is discontinuous.

More explicitly, a non-empty $F_\sigma$ set $E$ belongs to $M_3$ if, for every $x\in E$, any sequence of closed intervals $I_n$ not containing $x$, with $\operatorname{dist}(x,I_n)\to 0$ and $\lambda(I_n\cap E)=0$, satisfies
$$\frac{\lambda(I_n)}{\operatorname{dist}(x,I_n)}\to 0,$$
where $\lambda$ denotes Lebesgue measure. Thus, near a point of $E$, gaps in $E$ cannot have length comparable to their distance from the point. The class $M_4$ is stronger: $E$ belongs to $M_4$ if it can be written as a countable union of closed sets $E=\bigcup K_n$ such that, on each $K_n$, the set $E$ occupies a uniformly positive proportion of every sufficiently small one-sided interval whose length is comparable with its distance from the point. In this sense, $M_3$ rules out large nearby holes, while $M_4$ imposes a uniform positive lower-density condition.
