= Alexandru Froda =

Romanian mathematician (1894–1973)

- Born: July 16, 1894; Bucharest, Kingdom of Romania
- Died: October 7, 1973 (aged 79); Bucharest, Socialist Republic of Romania
- Education: University of Bucharest; University of Paris
- Known for: Froda's theorem
- Scientific career
- Fields: Mathematician
- Workplaces: University of Bucharest
- Thesis: Sur la distribution des propriétés de voisinage des functions de variables réelles (1929)
- Doctoral advisor: Émile Borel

Alexandru Froda (July 16, 1894 – October 7, 1973) was a Romanian mathematician with contributions in the field of mathematical analysis, algebra, number theory and rational mechanics. In his 1929 thesis he provided the namesake proof of an often unnamed theorem now sometimes called Froda's theorem.

== Life ==
Alexandru Froda was born in Bucharest in 1894. In 1927 he graduated from the University of Sciences (now the Faculty of Mathematics of the University of Bucharest). He received his Ph.D. from the University of Paris in 1929 under the direction of Émile Borel.

Froda was elected president of the Romanian Mathematical Society in 1946. In 1948 he became professor in the Faculty of Mathematics and Physics of the University of Bucharest.

== Work ==
Froda's major contribution was in the field of mathematical analysis. His first important result was concerned with the set of discontinuities of a real-valued function of a real variable. In this theorem Froda proves that the set of simple discontinuities of a real-valued function of a real variable is at most countable.

In a paper from 1936 he proved a necessary and sufficient condition for a function to be measurable. In the theory of algebraic equations, Froda proved a method of solving algebraic equations having complex coefficients.

In 1929 Dimitrie Pompeiu conjectured that any continuous function of two real variables defined on the entire plane is constant if the integral over any circle in the plane is constant. In the same year Froda proved that, in the case that the conjecture is true, the condition that the function is defined on the whole plane is indispensable. Later it was shown that the conjecture is not true in general.

In 1907 Pompeiu constructed an example of a continuous function with a nonzero derivative which has a zero in every interval. Using this result Froda finds a new way of looking at an older problem posed by Mikhail Lavrentyev in 1925, namely whether there is a function of two real variables such that the ordinary differential equation $dy=f(x,y)dx$ has at least two solutions passing through every point in the plane.

In the theory of numbers, beside rational triangles he also proved several conditions for a real number, which is the limit of a rational convergent sequence, to be irrational, extending a previous result of Viggo Brun from 1910.

In 1937 Froda independently noticed and proved the case $n=1$ of the Borsuk–Ulam theorem. He died in Bucharest in 1973.

== See also ==
- Froda's theorem
