= René-Louis Baire =

French mathematician (1874–1932)

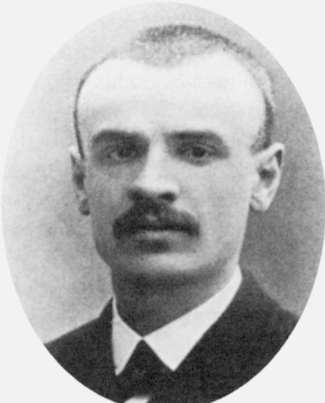
- Born: 21 January 1874; Paris
- Died: 5 July 1932 (aged 58); Chambéry
- Education: École Normale Supérieure
- Known for: Baire category theorem Baire function Baire measure Baire property Baire set Baire space Normal convergence Nowhere dense set
- Awards: Prix Francoeur (1920-1921); Peccor Lecture (1903-1904)
- Scientific career
- Fields: Mathematics
- Workplaces: École Normale Supérieure; University of Dijon
- Thesis: Sur les fonctions de variables réelles (1899)
- Doctoral students: Arnaud Denjoy

René-Louis Baire (French: [bɛʁ]; 21 January 1874 – 5 July 1932) was a French mathematician most famous for his Baire category theorem, which helped to generalize and prove future theorems. His theory was published originally in his dissertation Sur les fonctions de variables réelles ("On the Functions of Real Variables") in 1899.

== Education and career ==
The son of a tailor, Baire was one of three children from a poor working-class family in Paris. He started his studies when he entered the Lycée Lakanal through the use of a scholarship. In 1890, Baire completed his advanced classes and entered the special mathematics section of the Lycée Henri IV. While there, he prepared for and passed the entrance examination for the École Normale Supérieure and the École Polytechnique. He decided to attend the École Normale Supérieure in 1891. After receiving his three-year degree, Baire proceeded toward his agrégation. He did better than all the other students on the writing portion of the test but he did not pass the oral examination due to a lack of explanation and clarity in his lesson. After retaking the agrégation and passing, he was assigned to teach at the secondary school (lycée) in Bar-le-Duc. While there, Baire researched the concept of limits and discontinuity for his doctorate. He presented his thesis on March 24, 1899 and was awarded his doctorate. He continued to teach in secondary schools around France but was not happy teaching lower level mathematics. In 1901 Baire was appointed to the University of Montpellier as a "Maître de conférences". In 1904 he was awarded a Peccot Foundation Fellowship to spend a semester in a university and develop his skills as a professor. Baire chose to attend the Collège de France where he lectured on the subject of analysis. He was appointed to a university post in 1905 when he joined the Faculty of Science at the University of Dijon. In 1907 he was promoted to Professor of Analysis at Dijon where he continued his research in analysis.

== Illness ==
Since he was young, Baire always had "delicate" health. He had developed problems with his esophagus before he attended school and he would occasionally experience severe attacks of agoraphobia. From time to time, his health would prevent him from working or studying. The bad spells became more frequent, immobilizing him for long periods of time. Over time, he had developed a kind of psychological disorder that made him unable to undertake work that required long periods of concentration. At times this would make his ability to research mathematics impossible. Between 1909 and 1914 this problem continually plagued him and his teaching duties became more and more difficult. In 1914 he was given a leave of absence from the University of Dijon due to his poor health, after which he spent the rest of his life in Lausanne, Switzerland, and around Lake Geneva. He retired from Dijon in 1925 and spent his last years living in multiple hotels that he could afford with his meager pension. He committed suicide in 1932.

== Contributions to mathematics ==
Baire's skill in mathematical analysis led him to study with other major names in analysis such as Vito Volterra and Henri Lebesgue. In his dissertation Sur les fonctions de variable réelles ("On the Functions of Real Variables"), Baire studied a combination of set theory and analysis topics to arrive at the Baire category theorem and the definition of a nowhere dense set. He then used these topics to prove the theorems of those he studied with and further the understanding of continuity. Among Baire's other most important works are Théorie des nombres irrationnels, des limites et de la continuité (Theory of Irrational Numbers, Limits, and Continuity) published in 1905 and both volumes of Leçons sur les théories générales de l’analyse (Lessons on the General Theory of Analysis) published in 1907–08.

== See also ==
- Baire space (set theory)
