= Fraňková–Helly selection theorem =

On convergent subsequences of regulated functions

In mathematics, the Fraňková–Helly selection theorem is a generalisation of Helly's selection theorem for functions of bounded variation to the case of regulated functions. It was proved in 1991 by the Czech mathematician Dana Fraňková.

== Background ==
Let X be a separable Hilbert space, and let BV([0, T]; X) denote the normed vector space of all functions f : [0, T] → X with finite total variation over the interval [0, T], equipped with the total variation norm. It is well known that BV([0, T]; X) satisfies the compactness theorem known as Helly's selection theorem: given any sequence of functions (f_{n})_{n∈N} in BV([0, T]; X) that is uniformly bounded in the total variation norm, there exists a subsequence

$$\left( f_{n(k)} \right) \subseteq (f_{n}) \subset \mathrm{BV}([0, T]; X)$$

and a limit function f ∈ BV([0, T]; X) such that f_{n(k)}(t) converges weakly in X to f(t) for every t ∈ [0, T]. That is, for every continuous linear functional λ ∈ X*,

$$\lambda \left( f_{n(k)}(t) \right) \to \lambda(f(t)) \mbox{ in } X \mbox{ as } k \to \infty.$$

Consider now the Banach space Reg([0, T]; X) of all regulated functions f : [0, T] → X, equipped with the supremum norm. Helly's theorem does not hold for the space Reg([0, T]; X): a counterexample is given by the sequence

$$f_{n} (t) = \sin (n t).$$

One may ask, however, if a weaker selection theorem is true, and the Fraňková–Helly selection theorem is such a result.

== Statement of the Fraňková–Helly selection theorem ==
As before, let X be a separable Hilbert space and let Reg([0, T]; X) denote the space of regulated functions f : [0, T] → X, equipped with the supremum norm. Let (f_{n})_{n∈N} be a sequence in Reg([0, T]; X) satisfying the following condition: for every ε > 0, there exists some L_{ε} > 0 so that each f_{n} may be approximated by a u_{n} ∈ BV([0, T]; X) satisfying

$$\| f_{n} - u_{n} \|_{\infty} < \varepsilon$$

and

$$| u_{n}(0) | + \mathrm{Var}(u_{n}) \leq L_{\varepsilon},$$

where |-| denotes the norm in X and Var(u) denotes the variation of u, which is defined to be the supremum

$$\sup_{\Pi} \sum_{j=1}^{m} | u(t_{j}) - u(t_{j-1}) |$$

over all partitions

$$\Pi = \{ 0 = t_{0} < t_{1} < \dots < t_{m} = T , m \in \mathbf{N} \}$$

of [0, T]. Then there exists a subsequence

$$\left( f_{n(k)} \right) \subseteq (f_{n}) \subset \mathrm{Reg}([0, T]; X)$$

and a limit function f ∈ Reg([0, T]; X) such that f_{n(k)}(t) converges weakly in X to f(t) for every t ∈ [0, T]. That is, for every continuous linear functional λ ∈ X*,

$$\lambda \left( f_{n(k)}(t) \right) \to \lambda(f(t)) \mbox{ in } \mathbb{R} \mbox{ as } k \to \infty.$$
