= Discontinuities of monotone functions =

Monotone maps have countable discontinuities

In the mathematical field of analysis, a well-known theorem describes the set of discontinuities of a monotone real-valued function of a real variable; all discontinuities of such a (monotone) function are necessarily jump discontinuities and there are at most countably many of them.

Usually, this theorem appears in literature without a name. It is called Froda's theorem in some recent works; in his 1929 dissertation, Alexandru Froda stated that the result was previously well-known and had provided his own elementary proof for the sake of convenience. Prior work on discontinuities had already been discussed in the 1875 memoir of the French mathematician Jean Gaston Darboux.

== Definitions ==
Denote the limit from the left by
$$f\left(x^-\right) := \lim_{z \nearrow x} f(z) = \lim_{\stackrel{h \to 0}{h > 0}} f(x-h)$$
and denote the limit from the right by
$$f\left(x^+\right) := \lim_{z \searrow x} f(z) = \lim_{\stackrel{h \to 0}{h > 0}} f(x+h).$$

If $f\left(x^+\right)$ and $f\left(x^-\right)$ exist and are finite then the difference $f\left(x^+\right) - f\left(x^-\right)$ is called the jump of $f$ at $x.$

Consider a real-valued function $f$ of real variable $x$ defined in a neighborhood of a point $x.$ If $f$ is discontinuous at the point $x$ then the discontinuity will be a removable discontinuity, or an essential discontinuity, or a jump discontinuity (also called a discontinuity of the first kind). If the function is continuous at $x$ then the jump at $x$ is zero. Moreover, if $f$ is not continuous at $x,$ the jump can be zero at $x$ if $f\left(x^+\right) = f\left(x^-\right) \neq f(x).$

== Precise statement ==
Let $f$ be a real-valued monotone function defined on an interval $I.$ Then the set of discontinuities of the first kind is at most countable.

One can prove that all points of discontinuity of a monotone real-valued function defined on an interval are jump discontinuities and hence, by our definition, of the first kind. With this remark the theorem takes the stronger form:

Let $f$ be a monotone function defined on an interval $I.$ Then the set of discontinuities is at most countable.

== Proofs ==
This proof starts by proving the special case where the function's domain is a closed and bounded interval $[a, b].$ The proof of the general case follows from this special case.

=== Proof when the domain is closed and bounded ===
Two proofs of this special case are given.

==== Proof 1 ====
Let $I := [a, b]$ be an interval and let $f : I \to \R$ be a non-decreasing function (such as an increasing function). Then for any $a < x < b,$
$$f(a) ~\leq~ f\left(a^+\right) ~\leq~ f\left(x^-\right) ~\leq~ f\left(x^+\right) ~\leq~ f\left(b^-\right) ~\leq~ f(b).$$
Let $\alpha > 0$ and let $x_1 < x_2 < \cdots < x_n$ be $n$ points inside $I$ at which the jump of $f$ is greater or equal to $\alpha$:
$$f\left(x_i^+\right) - f\left(x_i^-\right) \geq \alpha,\ i=1,2,\ldots,n$$

For any $i=1,2,\ldots,n,$ $f\left(x_i^+\right) \leq f\left(x_{i+1}^-\right)$ so that $f\left(x_{i+1}^-\right) - f\left(x_i^+\right) \geq 0.$ Consequently,
$$\begin{alignat}{9}
f(b) - f(a)
&\geq f\left(x_n^+\right) - f\left(x_1^-\right) \\
&= \sum_{i=1}^n \left[f\left(x_i^+\right) - f\left(x_i^-\right)\right] + \sum_{i=1}^{n-1} \left[f\left(x_{i+1}^-\right) - f\left(x_i^+\right)\right] \\
&\geq \sum_{i=1}^n \left[f\left(x_i^+\right) - f\left(x_i^-\right)\right] \\
&\geq n \alpha
\end{alignat}$$
and hence $n \leq \frac{f(b) - f(a)}{\alpha}.$

Since $f(b) - f(a) < \infty$ we have that the number of points at which the jump is greater than $\alpha$ is finite (possibly even zero).

Define the following sets:
$$S_1: = \left\{x : x \in I, f\left(x^+\right) - f\left(x^-\right) \geq 1\right\},$$
$$S_n: = \left\{x : x \in I, \frac{1}{n} \leq f\left(x^+\right) - f\left(x^-\right) < \frac{1}{n-1}\right\},\ n\geq 2.$$

Each set $S_n$ is finite or the empty set. The union $S = \bigcup_{n=1}^\infty S_n$ contains all points at which the jump is positive and hence contains all points of discontinuity. Since every $S_i,\ i=1,2,\ldots$ is at most countable, their union $S$ is also at most countable.

If $f$ is non-increasing (or decreasing) then the proof is similar. This completes the proof of the special case where the function's domain is a closed and bounded interval. $\blacksquare$

==== Proof 2 ====
For a monotone function $f$, let $f\nearrow$ mean that $f$ is monotonically non-decreasing and let $f\searrow$ mean that $f$ is monotonically non-increasing. Let $f : [a, b] \to \R$ is a monotone function and let $D$ denote the set of all points $d \in [a, b]$ in the domain of $f$ at which $f$ is discontinuous (which is necessarily a jump discontinuity).

Because $f$ has a jump discontinuity at $d \in D,$ $f\left(d^-\right) \neq f\left(d^+\right)$ so there exists some rational number $y_d \in \Q$ that lies strictly in between $f\left(d^-\right) \text{ and } f\left(d^+\right)$ (specifically, if $f \nearrow$ then pick $y_d \in \Q$ so that $f\left(d^-\right) < y_d < f\left(d^+\right)$ while if $f \searrow$ then pick $y_d \in \Q$ so that $f\left(d^-\right) > y_d > f\left(d^+\right)$ holds).

It will now be shown that if $d, e \in D$ are distinct, say with $d < e,$ then $y_d \neq y_e.$ If $f \nearrow$ then $d < e$ implies $f\left(d^+\right) \leq f\left(e^-\right)$ so that $y_d < f\left(d^+\right) \leq f\left(e^-\right) < y_e.$ If on the other hand $f \searrow$ then $d < e$ implies $f\left(d^+\right) \geq f\left(e^-\right)$ so that $y_d > f\left(d^+\right) \geq f\left(e^-\right) > y_e.$ Either way, $y_d \neq y_e.$

Thus every $d \in D$ is associated with a unique rational number (said differently, the map $D \to \Q$ defined by $d \mapsto y_d$ is injective). Since $\Q$ is countable, the same must be true of $D.$ $\blacksquare$

=== Proof of general case ===
Suppose that the domain of $f$ (a monotone real-valued function) is equal to a union of countably many closed and bounded intervals; say its domain is $\bigcup_{n} \left[a_n, b_n\right]$ (no requirements are placed on these closed and bounded intervals (Note: So for instance, these intervals need not be pairwise disjoint nor is it required that they intersect only at endpoints. It is even possible that $\left[a_n, b_n\right] \subseteq \left[a_{n+1}, b_{n+1}\right]$ for all $n$)). It follows from the special case proved above that for every index $n,$ the restriction $f\big\vert_{\left[a_n, b_n\right]} : \left[a_n, b_n\right] \to \R$ of $f$ to the interval $\left[a_n, b_n\right]$ has at most countably many discontinuities; denote this (countable) set of discontinuities by $D_n.$ If $f$ has a discontinuity at a point $x_0 \in \bigcup_{n} \left[a_n, b_n\right]$ in its domain then either $x_0$ is equal to an endpoint of one of these intervals (that is, $x_0 \in \left\{a_1, b_1, a_2, b_2, \ldots\right\}$) or else there exists some index $n$ such that $a_n < x_0 < b_n,$ in which case $x_0$ must be a point of discontinuity for $f\big\vert_{\left[a_n, b_n\right]}$ (that is, $x_0 \in D_n$). Thus the set $D$ of all points of at which $f$ is discontinuous is a subset of $\left\{a_1, b_1, a_2, b_2, \ldots\right\} \cup \bigcup_{n} D_n,$ which is a countable set (because it is a union of countably many countable sets) so that its subset $D$ must also be countable (because every subset of a countable set is countable).

In particular, because every interval (including open intervals and half open/closed intervals) of real numbers can be written as a countable union of closed and bounded intervals, it follows that any monotone real-valued function defined on an interval has at most countable many discontinuities.

To make this argument more concrete, suppose that the domain of $f$ is an interval $I$ that is not closed and bounded (and hence by Heine–Borel theorem not compact). Then the interval can be written as a countable union of closed and bounded intervals $I_n$ with the property that any two consecutive intervals have an endpoint in common: $I = \cup_{n=1}^\infty I_n.$ If $I = (a,b] \text{ with } a \geq -\infty$ then $I_1 = \left[\alpha_1, b\right],\ I_2 = \left[\alpha_2, \alpha_1\right], \ldots, I_n = \left[\alpha_n, \alpha_{n-1}\right], \ldots$ where $\left(\alpha_n\right)_{n=1}^{\infty}$ is a strictly decreasing sequence such that $\alpha_n \rightarrow a.$ In a similar way if $I = [a,b), \text{ with } b \leq +\infty$ or if $I = (a,b) \text{ with } -\infty \leq a < b \leq \infty.$ In any interval $I_n,$ there are at most countable many points of discontinuity, and since a countable union of at most countable sets is at most countable, it follows that the set of all discontinuities is at most countable. $\blacksquare$

== Jump functions ==
Examples. Let x_{1} < x_{2} < x_{3} < ⋅⋅⋅ be a countable subset of the compact interval [a,b] and let μ_{1}, μ_{2}, μ_{3}, ... be a positive sequence with finite sum. Set

$$f(x) = \sum_{n=1}^{\infty} \mu_n \chi_{[x_n,b]} (x)$$

where χ_{A} denotes the characteristic function of a compact interval A. Then f is a non-decreasing function on [a,b], which is continuous except for jump discontinuities at x_{n} for n ≥ 1. In the case of finitely many jump discontinuities, f is a step function. The examples above are generalised step functions; they are very special cases of what are called jump functions or saltus-functions.

More generally, the analysis of monotone functions has been studied by many mathematicians, starting from Abel, Jordan and Darboux. Following Riesz & Sz.-Nagy (1990), replacing a function by its negative if necessary, only the case of non-negative non-decreasing functions has to be considered. The domain [a,b] can be finite or have ∞ or −∞ as endpoints.

The main task is to construct monotone functions — generalising step functions — with discontinuities at a given denumerable set of points and with prescribed left and right discontinuities at each of these points. Let x_{n} (n ≥ 1) lie in (a, b) and take λ_{1}, λ_{2}, λ_{3}, ... and μ_{1}, μ_{2}, μ_{3}, ... non-negative with finite sum and with λ_{n} + μ_{n} > 0 for each n. Define

$f_n(x)=0\,\,$ for $\,\, x < x_n,\,\, f_n(x_n) = \lambda_n, \,\, f_n(x) = \lambda_n +\mu_n\,\,$ for $\,\, x > x_n.$

Then the jump function, or saltus-function, defined by

$$f(x)=\,\,\sum_{n=1}^\infty f_n(x) =\,\, \sum_{x_n\le x} \lambda_n + \sum_{x_n<x} \mu_n,$$

is non-decreasing on [a, b] and is continuous except for jump discontinuities at x_{n} for n ≥ 1.

To prove this, note that sup |f_{n}| = λ_{n} + μ_{n}, so that Σ f_{n} converges uniformly to f. Passing to the limit, it follows that

$f(x_n)-f(x_n-0)=\lambda_n,\,\,\, f(x_n+0)-f(x_n)=\mu_n,\,\,\,$ and $\,\, f(x\pm 0)=f(x)$

if x is not one of the x_{n}'s.

Conversely, by a differentiation theorem of Lebesgue, the jump function f is uniquely determined by the properties: (1) being non-decreasing and non-positive; (2) having given jump data at its points of discontinuity x_{n}; (3) satisfying the boundary condition f(a) = 0; and (4) having zero derivative almost everywhere.

Proof that a jump function has zero derivative almost everywhere.

Property (4) can be checked following Riesz & Sz.-Nagy (1990), Rubel (1963) and Komornik (2016). Without loss of generality, it can be assumed that f is a non-negative jump function defined on the compact [a,b], with discontinuities only in (a,b).

Note that an open set U of (a,b) is canonically the disjoint union of at most countably many open intervals I_{m}; that allows the total length to be computed ℓ(U)= Σ ℓ(I_{m}). Recall that a null set A is a subset such that, for any arbitrarily small ε' > 0, there is an open U containing A with ℓ(U) < ε'. A crucial property of length is that, if U and V are open in (a,b), then ℓ(U) + ℓ(V) = ℓ(U ∪ V) + ℓ(U ∩ V). It implies immediately that the union of two null sets is null; and that a finite or countable set is null.

Proposition 1. For c > 0 and a normalised non-negative jump function f, let U_{c}(f) be the set of points x such that

$${f(t)-f(s)\over t -s} > c$$

for some s, t with s < x < t. Then U_{c}(f) is open and has total length ℓ(U_{c}(f)) ≤ 4 c^{−1} (f(b) – f(a)).

Note that U_{c}(f) consists the points x where the slope of h is greater that c near x. By definition U_{c}(f) is an open subset of (a, b), so can be written as a disjoint union of at most countably many open intervals I_{k} = (a_{k}, b_{k}). Let J_{k} be an interval with closure in I_{k} and ℓ(J_{k}) = ℓ(I_{k})/2. By compactness, there are finitely many open intervals of the form (s,t) covering the closure of J_{k}. On the other hand, it is elementary that, if three fixed bounded open intervals have a common point of intersection, then their union contains one of the three intervals: indeed just take the supremum and infimum points to identify the endpoints. As a result, the finite cover can be taken as adjacent open intervals (s_{k,1},t_{k,1}), (s_{k,2},t_{k,2}), ... only intersecting at consecutive intervals. Hence

$$\ell(J_k) \le \sum_m (t_{k,m} - s_{k,m}) \le \sum_m c^{-1}(f(t_{k,m})-f(s_{k,m})) \le 2 c^{-1}(f(b_k)-f(a_k)).$$

Finally sum both sides over k.

Proposition 2. If f is a jump function, then f '(x) = 0 almost everywhere.

To prove this, define

$$Df(x)= \limsup_{s,t\rightarrow x,\,\, s<x< t} {f(t)-f(s)\over t-s},$$

a variant of the Dini derivative of f. It will suffice to prove that for any fixed c > 0, the Dini derivative satisfies Df(x) ≤ c almost everywhere, i.e. on a null set.

Choose ε > 0, arbitrarily small. Starting from the definition of the jump function f = Σ f_{n}, write f = g + h with g = Σ_{n≤N} f_{n} and h = Σ_{n>N} f_{n} where N ≥ 1. Thus g is a step function having only finitely many discontinuities at x_{n} for n ≤ N and h is a non-negative jump function. It follows that Df = g' +Dh = Dh except at the N points of discontinuity of g. Choosing N sufficiently large so that Σ_{n>N} λ_{n} + μ_{n} < ε, it follows that h is a jump function such that h(b) − h(a) < ε and Dh ≤ c off an open set with length less than 4ε/c.

By construction Df ≤ c off an open set with length less than 4ε/c. Now set ε' = 4ε/c — then ε' and c are arbitrarily small and Df ≤ c off an open set of length less than ε'. Thus Df ≤ c almost everywhere. Since c could be taken arbitrarily small, Df and hence also f ' must vanish almost everywhere.

As explained in Riesz & Sz.-Nagy (1990), every non-decreasing non-negative function F can be decomposed uniquely as a sum of a jump function f and a continuous monotone function g: the jump function f is constructed by using the jump data of the original monotone function F and it is easy to check that g = F − f is continuous and monotone.

== See also ==
- Continuous function – Mathematical function with no sudden changes
- Bounded variation – Real function with finite total variation
- Monotone function

== Bibliography ==
- Apostol, Tom M. (1957). Mathematical Analysis: a Modern Approach to Advanced Calculus. Addison-Wesley. pp. 162–163. MR 0087718.
- Boas, Ralph P. Jr. (1961). "Differentiability of jump functions" (PDF). Colloq. Math. 8: 81–82. doi:10.4064/cm-8-1-81-82. MR 0126513.
- Boas, Ralph P. Jr. (1996). "22. Monotonic functions". A Primer of Real Functions. Carus Mathematical Monographs. Vol. 13 (Fourth ed.). MAA. pp. 158–174. ISBN 978-1-61444-013-0. (subscription required)
- Burkill, J. C. (1951). The Lebesgue integral. Cambridge Tracts in Mathematics and Mathematical Physics. Vol. 40. Cambridge University Press. MR 0045196.
- Edgar, Gerald A. (2008). "Topological Dimension". Measure, topology, and fractal geometry. Undergraduate Texts in Mathematics (Second ed.). Springer-Verlag. pp. 85–114. ISBN 978-0-387-74748-4. MR 2356043.
- Gelbaum, Bernard R.; Olmsted, John M. H. (1964), "18: A monotonic function whose points of discontinuity form an arbitrary countable (possibly dense) set", Counterexamples in Analysis, The Mathesis Series, San Francisco, London, Amsterdam: Holden-Day, p. 28, MR 0169961; reprinted by Dover, 2003
- Hobson, Ernest W. (1907). The Theory of Functions of a Real Variable and their Fourier's Series. Cambridge University Press. p. 245.
- Komornik, Vilmos (2016). "4. Monotone Functions". Lectures on functional analysis and the Lebesgue integral. Universitext. Springer-Verlag. pp. 151–164. ISBN 978-1-4471-6810-2. MR 3496354.
- Lipiński, J. S. (1961). "Une simple démonstration du théorème sur la dérivée d'une fonction de sauts" (PDF). Colloq. Math. (in French). 8 (2): 251–255. doi:10.4064/cm-8-2-251-255. MR 0158036.
- Łojasiewicz, Stanisław (1988). "1. Functions of bounded variation". An introduction to the theory of real functions. Translated by G. H. Lawden (Third ed.). Chichester: John Wiley & Sons. pp. 10–30. ISBN 0-471-91414-2. MR 0952856.
- Natanson, Isidor P. (1955), "III. Functions of finite variation. The Stieltjes integral", Theory of functions of a real variable, vol. 1, translated by Leo F. Boron, New York: Frederick Ungar, pp. 204–206, MR 0067952
- Nicolescu, M.; Dinculeanu, N.; Marcus, S. (1971), Analizǎ Matematică (in Romanian), vol. I (4th ed.), Bucharest: Editura Didactică şi Pedagogică, p. 783, MR 0352352
- Olmsted, John M. H. (1959), Real Variables: An Introduction to the Theory of Functions, The Appleton-Century Mathematics Series, New York: Appleton-Century-Crofts, Exercise 29, p. 59, MR 0117304
- Riesz, Frigyes; Sz.-Nagy, Béla (1990). "Saltus Functions". Functional analysis. Translated by Leo F. Boron. Dover Books. pp. 13–15. ISBN 0-486-66289-6. MR 1068530. Reprint of the 1955 original.
- Saks, Stanisław (1937). "III. Functions of bounded variation and the Lebesgue-Stieltjes integral" (PDF). Theory of the integral. Monografie Matematyczne. Vol. VII. Translated by L. C. Young. New York: G. E. Stechert. pp. 96–98.
- Rubel, Lee A. (1963). "Differentiability of monotonic functions" (PDF). Colloq. Math. 10 (2): 277–279. doi:10.4064/cm-10-2-277-279. MR 0154954.
- Rudin, Walter (1964), Principles of Mathematical Analysis (2nd ed.), New York: McGraw-Hill, MR 0166310
- von Neumann, John (1950). "IX. Monotonic Functions". Functional Operators. I. Measures and Integrals. Annals of Mathematics Studies. Vol. 21. Princeton University Press. pp. 63–82. doi:10.1515/9781400881895. ISBN 978-1-4008-8189-5. MR 0032011.
- Young, William Henry; Young, Grace Chisholm (1911). "On the Existence of a Differential Coefficient". Proc. London Math. Soc. 2. 9 (1): 325–335. doi:10.1112/plms/s2-9.1.325.
