= Conway's base 13 function =

Counterexample to the converse of the intermediate value theorem

Conway's base 13 function is a mathematical function created by British mathematician John H. Conway as a counterexample to the converse of the intermediate value theorem. In other words, it is a function that satisfies a particular intermediate-value property — on any interval $(a,b)$, the function $f$ takes every value between $f(a)$ and $f(b)$ — but is not continuous.

Conway's base 13 function is an example of a simple-to-define function which takes on every real value in every interval, that is, it is an everywhere surjective function. It is thus discontinuous at every point. Conway's creation of the function has been attested to by the mathematician Adebisi Agboola, who reported that Raymond Lickorish had told students in a lecture in 1982 about Conway referencing the function during a discussion about continuity.

== Sketch of definition ==
- Every real number $x$ can be represented in base 13 in a unique canonical way; such representations use the digits 0–9 plus three additional symbols, say {A, B, C}. For example, the number 54349589 has a base-13 representation B34C128.
- If instead of {A, B, C}, we judiciously choose the symbols {+, −, .}, some numbers in base 13 will have representations that look like well-formed decimals in base 10: for example, the number 54349589 has a base-13 representation of −34.128. Of course, most numbers will not be intelligible in this way; for example, the number 3629256 has the base-13 representation 9+0−−7.
- Conway's base-13 function takes in a real number x and considers its base-13 representation as a sequence of symbols {0, 1, ..., 9, +, −, .}. If from some position onward, the representation looks like a well-formed decimal number r, then f(x) = r. Otherwise, f(x) = 0. (Well-formed means that it starts with a + or − symbol, contains exactly one decimal-point symbol, and thereafter contains only the digits 0–9). For example, if a number x has the representation 8++2.19+0−−7+3.141592653, then f(x) = +3.141592653.

== Definition ==
Conway defined his base-13 function $f: \Reals \to \Reals$ as follows. Write the argument $x$ value as a tridecimal (a "decimal" in base 13) using 13 symbols as "digits": 0, 1, ..., 9, A, B, C; there should be no trailing C recurring. There may be a leading sign, and somewhere there will be a tridecimal point to separate the integer part from the fractional part; these should both be ignored in the sequel. These "digits" can be thought of as having the values 0 to 12 respectively; Conway originally used the digits "+", "−" and "." instead of A, B, C, and underlined all of the base-13 "digits" to clearly distinguish them from the usual base-10 digits and symbols.

- If from some point onwards, the tridecimal expansion of $x$ is of the form $A x_1 x_2 \dots x_n C y_1 y_2 \dots$ where all the digits $x_i$ and $y_j$ are in $\{0, \dots, 9\},$ then $f(x) = x_1 \dots x_n . y_1 y_2 \dots$ in usual base-10 notation.
- Similarly, if the tridecimal expansion of $x$ ends with $B x_1 x_2 \dots x_n C y_1 y_2 \dots,$ then $f(x) = -x_1 \dots x_n . y_1 y_2 \dots.$
- Otherwise, $f(x) = 0.$

For example:

- $f(\mathrm{12345A3C14.159} \dots_{13}) = f(\mathrm{A3C14.159} \dots_{13}) = 3.14159 \dots,$
- $f(\mathrm{B1C234}_{13}) = -1.234,$
- $f(\mathrm{1C234A567}_{13}) = 0.$

== Properties ==
- According to the intermediate-value theorem, every continuous real function $f$ has the intermediate-value property: on every interval (a, b), the function $f$ passes through every point between $f(a)$ and $f(b).$ The Conway base-13 function shows that the converse is false: it satisfies the intermediate-value property, but is not continuous.
- In fact, the Conway base-13 function satisfies a much stronger intermediate-value property—on every interval (a, b), the function $f$ passes through every real number. As a result, it satisfies a much stronger discontinuity property— it is discontinuous everywhere.
- From the above follows even more regarding the discontinuity of the function - its graph is dense in $\mathbb{R}^2$
- To prove that Conway's base-13 function satisfies this stronger intermediate property, let (a, b) be an interval, let c be a point in that interval, and let r be any real number. Create a base-13 encoding of r as follows: starting with the base-10 representation of r, replace the decimal point with C and indicate the sign of r by prepending either an A (if r is positive) or a B (if r is negative) to the beginning. By definition of Conway's base-13 function, the resulting string $\hat{r}$ has the property that $f(\hat{r}) = r.$ Moreover, any base-13 string that ends in $\hat{r}$ will have this property. Thus, if we replace the tail end of c with $\hat{r},$ the resulting number will have f(c') = r. By introducing this modification sufficiently far along the tridecimal representation of $c,$ you can ensure that the new number $c'$ will still lie in the interval $(a, b).$ This proves that for any number r, in every interval we can find a point $c'$ such that $f(c') = r.$
- Conway's base-13 function maps almost all the reals in any interval to 0.

== See also ==
- Darboux function
