= Weierstrass Nullstellensatz =

Theorem in mathematics

In mathematics, the Weierstrass Nullstellensatz is a version of the intermediate value theorem over a real closed field. It says:

Given a polynomial $f$ in one variable with coefficients in a real closed field F and $a < b$ in $F$, if $f(a) < 0 < f(b)$, then there exists a $c$ in $F$ such that $a < c < b$ and $f(c) = 0$.

== Proof ==
Since F is real-closed, F(i) is algebraically closed, hence f(x) can be written as $u\prod_i(x-\alpha_i)$, where $u\in F$ is the leading coefficient and $\alpha_j\in F(i)$ are the roots of f. Since each nonreal root $\alpha_j=a_j+ib_j$ can be paired with its conjugate $\overline\alpha_j=a_j-ib_j$ (which is also a root of f), we see that f can be factored in F[x] as a product of linear polynomials and polynomials of the form $(x-\alpha_j)(x-\overline\alpha_j)=(x-a_j)^2+b_j^2$, $b_j\ne0$.

If f changes sign between a and b, one of these factors must change sign. But $(x-a_j)^2+b_j^2$ is strictly positive for all x in any formally real field, hence one of the linear factors $x-\alpha_j$, $\alpha_j\in F$, must change sign between a and b; i.e., the root $\alpha_j$ of f satisfies $a<\alpha_j<b$.
