= Blumberg theorem =

Any real function on R admits a continuous restriction on a dense subset of R

In mathematics, the Blumberg theorem states that for any real function $f : \Reals \to \Reals$ there is a dense subset $D$ of $\Reals$ such that the restriction of $f$ to $D$ is continuous. It is named after its discoverer, the Russian-American mathematician Henry Blumberg.

== Examples ==
For instance, the restriction of the Dirichlet function (the indicator function of the rational numbers $\Q$) to $\Q$ is continuous, although the Dirichlet function is nowhere continuous in $\Reals.$

== Blumberg spaces ==
More generally, a Blumberg space is a topological space $X$ for which any function $f : X \to \Reals$ admits a continuous restriction on a dense subset of $X.$ The Blumberg theorem therefore asserts that $\mathbb{R}$ (equipped with its usual topology) is a Blumberg space.

If $X$ is a metric space then $X$ is a Blumberg space if and only if it is a Baire space. The Blumberg problem is to determine whether a compact Hausdorff space must be Blumberg. A counterexample was given in 1974 by Ronnie Levy, conditional on Luzin's hypothesis, that $2^{\aleph_0}=2^{\aleph_1}.$ The problem was resolved in 1975 by William A. R. Weiss, who gave an unconditional counterexample. It was constructed by taking the disjoint union of two compact Hausdorff spaces, one of which could be proven to be non-Blumberg if the continuum hypothesis was true, the other if it was false.

== Motivation and discussion ==
The restriction of any continuous function to any subset of its domain (dense or otherwise) is always continuous, so the conclusion of the Blumberg theorem is only interesting for functions that are not continuous. Given a function that is not continuous, it is typically not surprising to discover that its restriction to some subset is once again not continuous, (Note: Every function $f$ that is not continuous can be restricted to some dense subset $D$ (specifically, its domain) on which its restriction $f\vert_D$ is not continuous, so only those subsets on which its restriction is continuous are interesting.) and so only those restrictions that are continuous are (potentially) interesting. Such restrictions are not all interesting, however. For example, the restriction of any function (even one as interesting as the Dirichlet function) to any subset on which it is constant will be continuous, although this fact is as uninteresting as constant functions. Similarly uninteresting, the restriction of any function (continuous or not) to a single point or to any finite subset of $\Reals$ (or more generally, to any discrete subspace of $\Reals,$ such as the integers $\Z$) will be continuous.

One case that is considerably more interesting is that of a non-continuous function $f$ whose restriction to some dense subset $D$ (of its domain) is continuous. An important fact about continuous $\Reals$-valued functions defined on dense subsets is that a continuous extension to all of $\Reals,$ if one exists, will be unique (there exist continuous functions defined on dense subsets of $\Reals,$ such as $f(x) = 1/x,$ that cannot be continuously extended to all of $\Reals$).

Thomae's function, for example, is not continuous (in fact, it is discontinuous at every rational number) although its restriction to the dense subset $\R\setminus\Q$ of irrational numbers is continuous. Similarly, every additive function $\Reals \to \Reals$ that is not linear (that is, not of the form $x \mapsto c x$ for some constant $c \in \Reals$) is a nowhere continuous function whose restriction to $\Q$ is continuous (such functions are the non-trivial solutions to Cauchy's functional equation). This raises the question: can such a dense subset always be found? The Blumberg theorem answer this question in the affirmative. In other words, every function $\R \to \R$ − no matter how poorly behaved it may be − can be restricted to some dense subset on which it is continuous. Said differently, the Blumberg theorem shows that there does not exist a function $\R \to \R$ that is so poorly behaved (with respect to continuity) that all of its restrictions to all possible dense subsets are discontinuous.

The theorem's conclusion becomes more interesting as the function becomes more pathological or poorly behaved. Imagine, for instance, defining a function $f : \Reals \to \Reals$ by picking each value $f(x)$ completely at random (so its graph would appear as infinitely many points scattered randomly about the plane $\Reals^2$); no matter how you ended up imagining it, the Blumberg theorem guarantees that even this function has some dense subset on which its restriction is continuous.

== See also ==
- Closed graph theorem (functional analysis) – Theorems connecting continuity to closure of graphs
- Densely defined operator – Linear operator on dense subset of its apparent domain
- Hahn–Banach theorem – Theorem on extension of bounded linear functionals
- Tietze extension theorem – Continuous maps on a closed subset of a normal space can be extended
- Whitney extension theorem – Partial converse of Taylor's theorem
