= Baire function =

In mathematics, Baire functions are functions obtained from continuous functions by transfinite iteration of the operation of forming pointwise limits of sequences of functions. They were introduced by René-Louis Baire in 1899. A Baire set is a set whose characteristic function is a Baire function.

== Classification of Baire functions ==
Baire functions of class α, for any countable ordinal number α, form a vector space of real-valued functions defined on a topological space, as follows.

- The Baire class 0 functions are the continuous functions.
- The Baire class 1 functions are those functions which are the pointwise limit of a sequence of Baire class 0 functions.
- In general, the Baire class α functions are all functions which are the pointwise limit of a sequence of functions of Baire class less than α.

Some authors define the classes slightly differently, by removing all functions of class less than α from the functions of class α. This means that each Baire function has a well defined class, but the functions of given class no longer form a vector space.

Henri Lebesgue proved that (for functions on the unit interval) each Baire class of a countable ordinal number contains functions not in any smaller class, and that there exist functions which are not in any Baire class.

== Baire class 1 ==
Examples:

- The derivative of any differentiable function is of class 1. An example of a differentiable function whose derivative is not continuous (at x = 0) is the function equal to $x^2 \sin(1/x)$ when x ≠ 0, and 0 when x = 0. An infinite sum of similar functions (scaled and displaced by rational numbers) can even give a differentiable function whose derivative is discontinuous on a dense set. However, it necessarily has points of continuity, which follows easily from The Baire Characterisation Theorem (below; take K = X = R).
- The characteristic function of the set of integers, which equals 1 if x is an integer and 0 otherwise. (An infinite number of large discontinuities.)
- Thomae's function, which is 0 for irrational x and 1/q for a rational number p/q (in reduced form). (A dense set of discontinuities, namely the set of rational numbers.)
- The characteristic function of the Cantor set, which equals 1 if x is in the Cantor set and 0 otherwise. This function is 0 for an uncountable set of x values, and 1 for an uncountable set. It is discontinuous wherever it equals 1 and continuous wherever it equals 0. It is approximated by the continuous functions $g_n(x) = \max(0,{1-nd(x,C)})$, where $d(x,C)$ is the distance of x from the nearest point in the Cantor set.

The Baire Characterisation Theorem states that a real valued function f defined on a Banach space X is a Baire-1 function if and only if for every non-empty closed subset K of X, the restriction of f to K has a point of continuity relative to the topology of K.

By another theorem of Baire, for every Baire-1 function the points of continuity are a comeager G_{δ} set (Kechris 1995, Theorem (24.14)).

== Baire class 2 ==
An example of a Baire class 2 function on the interval [0,1] that is not of class 1 is the characteristic function of the rational numbers, $\chi_\mathbb{Q}$, also known as the Dirichlet function which is discontinuous everywhere.

Proof

We present two proofs.

1. This can be seen by noting that for any finite collection of rationals, the characteristic function for this set is Baire 1: namely the function $g_n(x) = \max(0,{1-nd(x,K)})$ converges identically to the characteristic function of $K$, where $K$ is the finite collection of rationals. Since the rationals are countable, we can look at the pointwise limit of these things over $K_n = \{r_1,r_2,\dots,r_n\}$, where $r_n$ is an enumeration of the rationals. It is not Baire-1 by the theorem mentioned above: the set of discontinuities is the entire interval (certainly, the set of points of continuity is not comeager).
2. The Dirichlet function can be constructed as the double pointwise limit of a sequence of continuous functions, as follows:
  $$\forall x \in \mathbb R,\quad\chi_{\mathbb Q}(x) = \lim_{k\to\infty}\left(\lim_{j\to\infty}\left(\cos(k!\pi x)\right)^{2j}\right)$$
  for integer j and k.

== See also ==
- Baire set
- Nowhere continuous function
