= Regulated function =

In mathematics, a regulated function, or ruled function, is a certain kind of well-behaved function of a single real variable. Regulated functions arise as a class of integrable functions, and have several equivalent characterisations. Regulated functions were introduced by Nicolas Bourbaki in 1949, in their book "Livre IV: Fonctions d'une variable réelle".

== Definition ==
Let X be a Banach space with norm || - ||_{X}. A function f : [0, T] → X is said to be a regulated function if one (and hence both) of the following two equivalent conditions holds true:

- for every t in the interval [0, T], both the left and right limits f(t−) and f(t+) exist in X (apart from, obviously, f(0−) and f(T+));
- there exists a sequence of step functions φ_{n} : [0, T] → X converging uniformly to f (i.e. with respect to the supremum norm || - ||_{∞}).

For this equivalence to hold, the definition of "step function" must be the one that allows degenerate intervals (i.e., singletons).

It requires a little work to show that these two conditions are equivalent. However, it is relatively easy to see that the second condition may be re-stated in the following equivalent ways:

- for every δ > 0, there is some step function φ_{δ} : [0, T] → X such that

$$\| f - \varphi_\delta \|_\infty = \sup_{t \in [0, T]} \| f(t) - \varphi_\delta (t) \|_X < \delta;$$

- f lies in the closure of the space Step([0, T]; X) of all step functions from [0, T] into X (taking closure with respect to the supremum norm in the space B([0, T]; X) of all bounded functions from [0, T] into X).

== Properties of regulated functions ==
Let Reg([0, T]; X) denote the set of all regulated functions f : [0, T] → X.

- Sums and scalar multiples of regulated functions are again regulated functions. In other words, Reg([0, T]; X) is a vector space over the same field K as the space X; typically, K will be the real or complex numbers. If X is equipped with an operation of multiplication, then products of regulated functions are again regulated functions. In other words, if X is a K-algebra, then so is Reg([0, T]; X).
- The supremum norm is a norm on Reg([0, T]; X), and Reg([0, T]; X) is a topological vector space with respect to the topology induced by the supremum norm.
- As noted above, Reg([0, T]; X) is the closure in B([0, T]; X) of Step([0, T]; X) with respect to the supremum norm.
- For any Banach space X, Reg([0, T]; X) is also a Banach space with respect to the supremum norm.
- Reg([0, T]; R) forms an infinite-dimensional real Banach algebra: finite linear combinations and products of regulated functions are again regulated functions.
- Since a continuous function defined on a compact space (such as [0, T]) is automatically uniformly continuous, every continuous function f : [0, T] → X is also regulated. In fact, with respect to the supremum norm, the space C^{0}([0, T]; X) of continuous functions is a closed linear subspace of Reg([0, T]; X).
- The space BV([0, T]; X) of functions of bounded variation forms a dense linear subspace of Reg([0, T]; X):

$$\mathrm{Reg}([0, T]; X) = \overline{\mathrm{BV} ([0, T]; X)} \mbox{ w.r.t. } \| \cdot \|_{\infty}.$$

- A function f : [0, T] → X is regulated if and only if it is of bounded φ-variation for some φ:

$$\mathrm{Reg}([0, T]; X) = \bigcup_{\varphi} \mathrm{BV}_{\varphi} ([0, T]; X).$$

- If X is a separable Hilbert space, then Reg([0, T]; X) satisfies a compactness theorem known as the Fraňková–Helly selection theorem.
- The set of discontinuities of a regulated function is countable for such functions have only jump-type discontinuities. To see this it is sufficient to note that given $\epsilon > 0$, the set of points at which the right and left limits differ by more than $\epsilon$ is finite. In particular, the discontinuity set has measure zero, from which it follows that a regulated function has a well-defined Riemann integral.
  - Remark: In general, the set of points of discontinuity of any function [0, T] → X is an $F_\sigma$ set, and hence either has nonempty interior or is meager, a weaker condition than countability.
- The integral, as defined on step functions in the obvious way, extends naturally to Reg([0, T]; X) by defining the integral of a regulated function to be the limit of the integrals of any sequence of step functions converging uniformly to it. This extension is well-defined and satisfies all of the usual properties of an integral. In particular, the regulated integral
  - is a bounded linear function from Reg([0, T]; X) to X; hence, in the case X = R, the integral is an element of the space that is dual to Reg([0, T]; R);
  - agrees with the Riemann integral.
