= Local boundedness =

In mathematics, a function is locally bounded if it is bounded around every point. A family of functions is locally bounded if for any point in their domain all the functions are bounded around that point and by the same number.

== Locally bounded function ==
A real-valued or complex-valued function $f$ defined on some topological space $X$ is called a locally bounded functional if for any $x_0 \in X$ there exists a neighborhood $A$ of $x_0$ such that $f(A)$ is a bounded set. That is, for some number $M > 0$ one has
$$|f(x)| \leq M \quad \text{ for all } x \in A.$$

In other words, for each $x$ one can find a constant, depending on $x,$ which is larger than all the values of the function in the neighborhood of $x.$ Compare this with a bounded function, for which the constant does not depend on $x.$ Obviously, if a function is bounded then it is locally bounded. The converse is not true in general (see below).

This definition can be extended to the case when $f : X \to Y$ takes values in some metric space $(Y, d).$ Then the inequality above needs to be replaced with
$$d(f(x), y) \leq M \quad \text{ for all } x \in A,$$
where $y \in Y$ is some point in the metric space. The choice of $y$ does not affect the definition; choosing a different $y$ will at most increase the constant $r$ for which this inequality is true.

== Examples ==
- The function $f : \R \to \R$ defined by
  $$f(x) = \frac{1}{x^2+1}$$
  is bounded, because $0 \leq f(x) \leq 1$ for all $x.$ Therefore, it is also locally bounded.
- The function $f : \R \to \R$ defined by
  $$f(x) = 2x+3$$
  is not bounded, as it becomes arbitrarily large. However, it is locally bounded because for each $a,$ $|f(x)| \leq M$ in the neighborhood $(a - 1, a + 1),$ where $M = 2|a| + 5.$
- The function $f : \R \to \R$ defined by
  $$f(x) = \begin{cases}
\frac{1}{x}, & \mbox{if } x \neq 0, \\
0,  & \mbox{if } x = 0
\end{cases}$$
  is neither bounded nor locally bounded. In any neighborhood of 0 this function takes values of arbitrarily large magnitude.
- Any continuous function is locally bounded. Here is a proof for functions of a real variable. Let $f : U \to \R$ be continuous where $U \subseteq \R,$ and we will show that $f$ is locally bounded at $a$ for all $a \in U$ Taking ε = 1 in the definition of continuity, there exists $\delta > 0$ such that $|f(x) - f(a)| < 1$ for all $x \in U$ with $|x - a| < \delta$. Now by the triangle inequality, $|f(x)| = |f(x) - f(a) + f(a)| \leq |f(x) - f(a)| + |f(a)| < 1 + |f(a)|,$ which means that $f$ is locally bounded at $a$ (taking $M = 1 + |f(a)|$ and the neighborhood $(a - \delta, a + \delta)$). This argument generalizes easily to when the domain of $f$ is any topological space.
- The converse of the above result is not true however; that is, a discontinuous function may be locally bounded. For example consider the function $f : \R \to \R$ given by $f(0) = 1$ and $f(x) = 0$ for all $x \neq 0.$ Then $f$ is discontinuous at 0 but $f$ is locally bounded; it is locally constant apart from at zero, where we can take $M = 1$ and the neighborhood $(-1, 1),$ for example.

== Locally bounded family ==
A set (also called a family) U of real-valued or complex-valued functions defined on some topological space $X$ is called locally bounded if for any $x_0 \in X$ there exists a neighborhood $A$ of $x_0$ and a positive number $M > 0$ such that
$$|f(x)| \leq M$$
for all $x \in A$ and $f \in U.$ In other words, all the functions in the family must be locally bounded, and around each point they need to be bounded by the same constant.

This definition can also be extended to the case when the functions in the family U take values in some metric space, by again replacing the absolute value with the distance function.

== Examples ==
- The family of functions $f_n : \R \to \R$
  $$f_n(x) = \frac{x}{n}$$
  where $n = 1, 2, \ldots$ is locally bounded. Indeed, if $x_0$ is a real number, one can choose the neighborhood $A$ to be the interval $\left(x_0 - a, x_0 + 1\right).$ Then for all $x$ in this interval and for all $n \geq 1$ one has
  $$|f_n(x)| \leq M$$
  with $M = 1 + |x_0|.$ Moreover, the family is uniformly bounded, because neither the neighborhood $A$ nor the constant $M$ depend on the index $n.$
- The family of functions $f_n : \R \to \R$
  $$f_n(x) = \frac{1}{x^2+n^2}$$
  is locally bounded, if $n$ is greater than zero. For any $x_0$ one can choose the neighborhood $A$ to be $\R$ itself. Then we have
  $$|f_n(x)| \leq M$$
  with $M = 1.$ Note that the value of $M$ does not depend on the choice of x_{0} or its neighborhood $A.$ This family is then not only locally bounded, it is also uniformly bounded.
- The family of functions $f_n : \R \to \R$
  $$f_n(x) = x+n$$
  is not locally bounded. Indeed, for any $x$ the values $f_n(x)$ cannot be bounded as $n$ tends toward infinity.

== Topological vector spaces ==
Local boundedness may also refer to a property of topological vector spaces, or of functions from a topological space into a topological vector space (TVS).

=== Locally bounded topological vector spaces ===
A subset $B \subseteq X$ of a topological vector space (TVS) $X$ is called bounded if for each neighborhood $U$ of the origin in $X$ there exists a real number $s > 0$ such that
$$B \subseteq t U \quad \text{ for all } t > s.$$
A locally bounded TVS is a TVS that possesses a bounded neighborhood of the origin. By Kolmogorov's normability criterion, this is true of a locally convex space if and only if the topology of the TVS is induced by some seminorm. In particular, every locally bounded TVS is pseudometrizable.

=== Locally bounded functions ===
Let $f : X \to Y$ a function between topological vector spaces is said to be a locally bounded function if every point of $X$ has a neighborhood whose image under $f$ is bounded.

The following theorem relates local boundedness of functions with the local boundedness of topological vector spaces:

Theorem. A topological vector space $X$ is locally bounded if and only if the identity map $\operatorname{id}_X : X \to X$ is locally bounded.

== See also ==
- Bornological space – Space where bounded operators are continuous
- Bounded operator – Kind of linear transformation
- Bounded set (topological vector space) – Generalization of boundedness
