= Intermediate value theorem =

Continuous function on an interval takes on every value between its values at the ends

Illustration of the intermediate value theorem

In mathematical analysis, the intermediate value theorem states that if $f$ is a continuous function whose domain contains the interval [a, b] and $s$ is a number such that $f(a) < s < f(b)$, then there exists some $x$ between $a$ and $b$ such that $f(x) = s$. That is, the image of a continuous function over an interval is itself an interval that contains $f(a), f(b)$.

For example, suppose that $f \in C([1,2]), f(1) = 3, f(2) = 5$ , then the graph of $y = f(x)$ must pass through the horizontal line $y = 4$ while $x$ moves from $1$ to $2$. Over the interval, the set of function values has no gap, and the graph can be drawn without lifting a pencil from the paper.

The corollary Bolzano's theorem states that if a continuous function has values of opposite sign inside an interval, then it has a root in that interval. The theorem depends on, and is equivalent to, the completeness of the real numbers, although Weierstrass Nullstellensatz is a version of the intermediate value theorem for polynomials over a real closed field.

A similar result to the intermediate value theorem is the Borsuk–Ulam theorem, which underpins why rotating a wobbly table will always bring it to stability. Darboux's theorem states that all functions that result from the differentiation of some other function on some interval have the intermediate value property, even though they need not be continuous.

== Motivation ==
The intermediate value theorem

This captures an intuitive property of continuous functions over the real numbers: given $f$ continuous on $[1,2]$ with the known values $f(1) = 3$ and $f(2) = 5$, then the graph of $y = f(x)$ must pass through the horizontal line $y = 4$ while $x$ moves from $1$ to $2$. It represents the idea that the graph of a continuous function on a closed interval can be drawn without lifting a pencil from the paper.

== Theorem ==
The intermediate value theorem states the following:

Consider the closed interval $I = [a,b]$ of real numbers $\R$ and a continuous function $f \colon I \to \R$. Then

- Version I. if $u$ is a number between $f(a)$ and $f(b)$, that is,
  $$\min(f(a),f(b))<u<\max(f(a),f(b)),$$
  then there is a $c\in (a,b)$ such that $f(c)=u$.
- Version II. The image set $f(I)$ is also a closed interval, and it contains $\bigl[\min(f(a), f(b)),\max(f(a), f(b))\bigr]$. That is, the set of function values has no gap; for any two function values $c,d \in f(I)$ with $c < d$, all points in the interval $\bigl[c,d\bigr]$ are also function values,
  $$\bigl[c,d\bigr]\subseteq f(I).$$
  Fundamentally, a subset of the real numbers with no internal gap is an interval.

Version I is naturally contained in Version II.

== Proof ==
The theorem depends on, and is equivalent to, the completeness of the real numbers. The intermediate value theorem does not apply to the rational numbers Q because gaps exist between rational numbers; irrational numbers fill those gaps. For example, the function $f(x) = x^2$ for $x\in\Q$ satisfies $f(0) = 0$ and $f(2) = 4$. However, there is no rational number $x$ such that $f(x)=2$, because $\sqrt 2$ is an irrational number.

Despite the above, there is a version of the intermediate value theorem for polynomials over a real closed field; see the Weierstrass Nullstellensatz.

=== Proof version A ===
The theorem may be proven as a consequence of the completeness property of the real numbers as follows:

We shall prove the first case, $f(a) < u < f(b)$. The second case is similar.

1. Let $S$ be the set of all $x \in [a,b]$ such that $f(x)<u$.
2. Then $S$ is non-empty since $a$ is an element of $S$.
3. Since $S$ is non-empty and bounded above by $b$, by completeness, the supremum $c=\sup S$ exists. That is, $c$ is the smallest number that is greater than or equal to every member of $S$.

Note that, due to the continuity of $f$ at $a$, we can keep $f(x)$ within any $\varepsilon>0$ of $f(a)$ by keeping $x$ sufficiently close to $a$. Since $f(a)<u$ is a strict inequality, consider the implication when $\varepsilon$ is the distance between $u$ and $f(a)$. No $x$ sufficiently close to $a$ can then make $f(x)$ greater than or equal to $u$, which means there are values greater than $a$ in $S$. A more detailed proof goes like this:

1. Choose $\varepsilon=u-f(a)>0$. Then $\exists \delta>0$ such that $\forall x \in [a,b]$,
  $$|x-a|<\delta \implies |f(x)-f(a)|<u-f(a) \implies f(x)<u.$$
2. Consider the interval $[a,\min(a+\delta,b))=I_1$. Notice that $I_1 \subseteq [a,b]$ and every $x \in I_1$ satisfies the condition $|x-a|<\delta$. Therefore for every $x \in I_1$ we have $f(x)<u$. Hence $c$ cannot be $a$.

Likewise, due to the continuity of $f$ at $b$, we can keep $f(x)$ within any $\varepsilon > 0$ of $f(b)$ by keeping $x$ sufficiently close to $b$. Since $u<f(b)$ is a strict inequality, consider the similar implication when $\varepsilon$ is the distance between $u$ and $f(b)$. Every $x$ sufficiently close to $b$ must then make $f(x)$ greater than $u$, which means there are values smaller than $b$ that are upper bounds of $S$. A more detailed proof goes like this:

1. Choose $\varepsilon=f(b)-u>0$. Then $\exists \delta>0$ such that $\forall x \in [a,b]$,
  $$|x-b|<\delta \implies |f(x)-f(b)|<f(b)-u \implies f(x)>u.$$
2. Consider the interval $(\max(a,b-\delta),b]=I_2$. Notice that $I_2 \subseteq [a,b]$ and every $x \in I_2$ satisfies the condition $|x-b|<\delta$. Therefore for every $x \in I_2$ we have $f(x)>u$. Hence $c$ cannot be $b$.

With $c \neq a$ and $c \neq b$, it must be the case $c \in (a,b)$. Now we claim that $f(c)=u$.

Fix some $\varepsilon > 0$. Since $f$ is continuous at $c$, $\exists \delta_1>0$ such that $\forall x \in [a,b]$, $|x-c|<\delta_1 \implies |f(x) - f(c)| < \varepsilon$.

Since $c \in (a,b)$ and $(a,b)$ is open, $\exists \delta_2>0$ such that $(c-\delta_2,c+\delta_2) \subseteq (a,b)$. Set $\delta= \min(\delta_1,\delta_2)$. Then we have

$$f(x)-\varepsilon<f(c)<f(x)+\varepsilon$$
for all $x\in(c-\delta,c+\delta)$. By the properties of the supremum, there exists some $a^*\in (c-\delta,c]$ that is contained in $S$, and so
$$f(c)<f(a^*)+\varepsilon<u+\varepsilon.$$
Picking $a^{**}\in(c,c+\delta)$, we know that $a^{**}\not\in S$ because $c$ is the supremum of $S$. This means that
$$f(c)>f(a^{**})-\varepsilon \geq u-\varepsilon.$$
Both inequalities
$$u-\varepsilon<f(c)< u+\varepsilon$$

are valid for all $\varepsilon > 0$, from which we deduce $f(c) = u$ as the only possible value, as stated.

=== Proof version B ===
We will only prove the case of $f(a)<u<f(b)$, as the $f(a)>u>f(b)$ case is similar.

1. Define $g(x)=f(x)-u$ which is equivalent to $f(x)=g(x)+u$ and let us rewrite $f(a)<u<f(b)$ as $g(a)<0<g(b)$. We have to prove that $g(c)=0$ for some $c\in[a,b]$. We further define the set $S=\{x\in[a,b]:g(x)\leq 0\}$.
2. Because $g(a)<0$ we know, that $a\in S$ so, that $S$ is not empty.
3. Moreover, as $S\subseteq[a,b]$, we know that $S$ is bounded and non-empty, so by completeness, the supremum $c=\sup(S)$ exists.
4. There are 3 cases for the value of $g(c)$, those being $g(c)<0,g(c)>0$ and $g(c)=0$. For contradiction, let us assume, that $g(c)<0$.
5. By the definition of continuity, for $\epsilon=0-g(c)$, there exists a $\delta>0$ such that $x\in(c-\delta,c+\delta)$ implies, that $|g(x)-g(c)|<-g(c)$, which is equivalent to $g(x)<0$.
  1. If we just chose $x=c+\frac{\delta}{N}$, where $N>\frac{\delta}{b-c}+1$, then as $1 < N$, $x<c+\delta$, from which we get $g(x)<0$ and $c<x<b$, so $x\in S$.
  2. However, $x>c$, contradicting the fact that $c$ is an upper bound of $S$, so $g(c)\geq 0$.
6. Assume then, that $g(c)>0$. We similarly choose $\epsilon=g(c)-0$ and know, that there exists a $\delta>0$ such that $x\in(c-\delta,c+\delta)$ implies $|g(x)-g(c)|<g(c)$. We can rewrite this as $-g(c)<g(x)-g(c)<g(c)$ which implies, that $g(x)>0$.
  1. If we now choose $x=c-\frac{\delta}{2}$, then $g(x)>0$ and $a<x<c$.
  2. It follows that $x$ is an upper bound for $S$.
  3. However, $x<c$, which contradicts the least property of the least upper bound $c$, which means, that $g(c)>0$ is impossible.
7. If we combine both results, we get that $g(c)=0$ or $f(c)=u$ is the only remaining possibility.

Remark: The intermediate value theorem can also be proved using the methods of non-standard analysis, which places "intuitive" arguments involving infinitesimals on a rigorous footing.

== History ==
A form of the theorem was postulated as early as the 5th century BCE, in the work of Bryson of Heraclea on squaring the circle. Bryson argued that, as circles larger than and smaller than a given square both exist, there must exist a circle of equal area. The theorem was first proved by Bernard Bolzano in 1817. Bolzano used the following formulation of the theorem:

Let $f, \varphi$ be continuous functions on the interval between $\alpha$ and $\beta$ such that $f(\alpha) < \varphi(\alpha)$ and $f(\beta) > \varphi(\beta)$. Then there is an $x$ between $\alpha$ and $\beta$ such that $f(x) = \varphi(x)$.

The equivalence between this formulation and the modern one can be shown by setting $\varphi$ to the appropriate constant function. Augustin-Louis Cauchy provided the modern formulation and a proof in 1821. Both were inspired by the goal of formalizing the analysis of functions and the work of Joseph-Louis Lagrange. The idea that continuous functions possess the intermediate value property has an earlier origin. Simon Stevin proved the intermediate value theorem for polynomials (using a cubic as an example) by providing an algorithm for constructing the decimal expansion of the solution. The algorithm iteratively subdivides the interval into 10 parts, producing an additional decimal digit at each step of the iteration. Before the formal definition of continuity was given, the intermediate value property was given as part of the definition of a continuous function. Proponents include Louis Arbogast, who assumed the functions to have no jumps, satisfy the intermediate value property and have increments whose sizes corresponded to the sizes of the increments of the variable.

Earlier authors held the result to be intuitively obvious and requiring no proof. The insight of Bolzano and Cauchy was to define a general notion of continuity (in terms of infinitesimals in Cauchy's case and using real inequalities in Bolzano's case), and to provide a proof based on such definitions.

== Darboux functions ==
A Darboux function is a real-valued function f that has the "intermediate value property," i.e., that satisfies the conclusion of the intermediate value theorem: for any two values a and b in the domain of f, and any y between f(a) and f(b), there is some c between a and b with f(c) = y. The intermediate value theorem says that every continuous function is a Darboux function. However, not every Darboux function is continuous; i.e., the converse of the intermediate value theorem is false.

As an example, take the function f : [0, ∞) → [−1, 1] defined by f(x) = sin(1/x) for x > 0 and f(0) = 0. This function is not continuous at x = 0 because the limit of f(x) as x tends to 0 does not exist; yet the function has the intermediate value property. Another, more complicated example is given by Conway's base 13 function.

In fact, Darboux's theorem states that all functions that result from the differentiation of some other function on some interval have the intermediate value property (even though they need not be continuous).

Historically, this intermediate value property has been suggested as a definition for continuity of real-valued functions; this definition was not adopted.

== Generalizations ==
=== Multi-dimensional spaces ===
The Poincaré-Miranda theorem is a generalization of the Intermediate value theorem from a (one-dimensional) interval to a (two-dimensional) rectangle, or more generally, to an n-dimensional cube.

Vrahatis presents a similar generalization to triangles, or more generally, n-dimensional simplices. Let D^{n} be an n-dimensional simplex with n+1 vertices denoted by v_{0},...,v_{n}. Let F=(f_{1},...,f_{n}) be a continuous function from D^{n} to R^{n}, that never equals 0 on the boundary of D^{n}. Suppose F satisfies the following conditions:

- For all i in 1,...,n, the sign of f_{i}(v_{i}) is opposite to the sign of f_{i}(x) for all points x on the face opposite to v_{i};
- The sign-vector of f_{1},...,f_{n} on v_{0} is not equal to the sign-vector of f_{1},...,f_{n} on all points on the face opposite to v_{0}.

Then there is a point z in the interior of D^{n} on which F(z)=(0,...,0).

It is possible to normalize the f_{i} such that f_{i}(v_{i})>0 for all i; then the conditions become simpler:

- For all i in 1,...,n, f_{i}(v_{i})>0, and f_{i}(x)<0 for all points x on the face opposite to v_{i}. In particular, f_{i}(v_{0})<0.
- For all points x on the face opposite to v_{0}, f_{i}(x)>0 for at least one i in 1,...,n.

The theorem can be proved based on the Knaster–Kuratowski–Mazurkiewicz lemma. In can be used for approximations of fixed points and zeros.

=== General metric and topological spaces ===
The intermediate value theorem is closely linked to the topological notion of connectedness and follows from the basic properties of connected sets in metric spaces and connected subsets of R in particular:

- If $X$ and $Y$ are metric spaces, $f \colon X \to Y$ is a continuous map, and $E \subset X$ is a connected subset, then $f(E)$ is connected. (*)
- A subset $E \subset \R$ is connected if and only if it satisfies the following property: $x,y\in E,\ x < r < y \implies r \in E$. (**)

In fact, connectedness is a topological property and (*) generalizes to topological spaces: If $X$ and $Y$ are topological spaces, $f \colon X \to Y$ is a continuous map, and $X$ is a connected space, then $f(X)$ is connected. The preservation of connectedness under continuous maps can be thought of as a generalization of the intermediate value theorem, a property of continuous, real-valued functions of a real variable, to continuous functions in general spaces.

Recall the first version of the intermediate value theorem, stated previously:

Intermediate value theorem (Version I)—Consider a closed interval $I = [a,b]$ in the real numbers $\R$ and a continuous function $f\colon I\to\R$. Then, if $u$ is a real number such that $\min(f(a),f(b))< u < \max(f(a),f(b))$, there exists $c \in (a,b)$ such that $f(c) = u$.

The intermediate value theorem is an immediate consequence of these two properties of connectedness:

Proof

By (**), $I = [a,b]$ is a connected set. It follows from (*) that the image, $f(I)$, is also connected. For convenience, assume that $f(a) < f(b)$. Then once more invoking (**), $f(a) < u < f(b)$ implies that $u \in f(I)$, or $f(c) = u$ for some $c\in I$. Since $u\neq f(a), f(b)$, $c\in(a,b)$ must actually hold, and the desired conclusion follows. The same argument applies if $f(b) < f(a)$, so we are done. Q.E.D.

The intermediate value theorem generalizes in a natural way: Suppose that X is a connected topological space and (Y, <) is a totally ordered set equipped with the order topology, and let f : X → Y be a continuous map. If a and b are two points in X and u is a point in Y lying between f(a) and f(b) with respect to <, then there exists c in X such that f(c) = u. The original theorem is recovered by noting that R is connected and that its natural topology is the order topology.

The Brouwer fixed-point theorem is a related theorem that, in one dimension, gives a special case of the intermediate value theorem.

== In constructive mathematics ==
In constructive mathematics, the intermediate value theorem is not true. Instead, the weakened conclusion one must take states that the value may only be found in some range which may be arbitrarily small.

- Let $a$ and $b$ be real numbers and $f:[a,b] \to \R$ be a pointwise continuous function from the closed interval $[a,b]$ to the real line, and suppose that $f(a) < 0$ and $0 < f(b)$. Then for every positive number $\varepsilon > 0$ there exists a point $x$ in the open interval $(a,b)$ such that $\vert f(x) \vert < \varepsilon$.

== Practical applications ==
A similar result is the Borsuk–Ulam theorem, which says that a continuous map from the $n$-sphere to Euclidean $n$-space will always map some pair of antipodal points to the same place.

Proof for 1-dimensional case

Take $f$ to be any continuous function on a circle. Draw a line through the center of the circle, intersecting it at two opposite points $A$ and $B$. Define $d$ to be $f(A)-f(B)$. If the line is rotated 180 degrees, the value −d will be obtained instead. Due to the intermediate value theorem there must be some intermediate rotation angle for which d = 0, and as a consequence f(A) = f(B) at this angle.

In general, for any continuous function whose domain is some closed convex $n$-dimensional shape and any point inside the shape (not necessarily its center), there exist two antipodal points with respect to the given point whose functional value is the same.

The theorem also underpins the explanation of why rotating a wobbly table will bring it to stability (subject to certain easily met constraints).

== See also ==
- Mean value theorem
- Non-atomic measure
- Hairy ball theorem
- Sperner's lemma
