= Baire measure =

Measure for Baire sets in mathematics

In mathematics, a Baire measure is a measure on the σ-algebra of Baire sets of a topological space whose value on every compact Baire set is finite. In compact metric spaces the Borel sets and the Baire sets are the same, so Baire measures are the same as Borel measures that are finite on compact sets. In general Baire sets and Borel sets need not be the same. In spaces with non-Baire Borel sets, Baire measures are used because they connect to the properties of continuous functions more directly.

== Variations ==
There are several inequivalent definitions of Baire sets, so correspondingly there are several inequivalent concepts of Baire measure on a topological space. These all coincide on spaces that are locally compact σ-compact Hausdorff spaces.

== Relation to Borel measure ==
In practice Baire measures can be replaced by regular Borel measures. The relation between Baire measures and regular Borel measures is as follows:

- The restriction of a finite Borel measure to the Baire sets is a Baire measure.
- A finite Baire measure on a compact space is always regular.
- A finite Baire measure on a compact space is the restriction of a unique regular Borel measure.
- On compact (or σ-compact) metric spaces, Borel sets are the same as Baire sets and Borel measures are the same as Baire measures.

== Examples ==
- Counting measure on the unit interval is a measure on the Baire sets that is not regular (or σ-finite).
- The (left or right) Haar measure on a locally compact group is a Baire measure invariant under the left (right) action of the group on itself. In particular, if the group is an abelian group, the left and right Haar measures coincide and we say the Haar measure is translation invariant. See also Pontryagin duality.
