= Uniform boundedness =

Property of functions

In mathematics, a uniformly bounded family of functions is a family of bounded functions that can all be bounded by the same constant. This constant is larger than or equal to the absolute value of any value of any of the functions in the family.

== Definition ==
=== Real line and complex plane ===
Let

$$\mathcal F=\{f_i: X \to \mathbb{K}, i \in I\}$$

be a family of functions indexed by $I$, where $X$ is an arbitrary set and $\mathbb{K}$ is either the set of real $\mathbb{R}$ or complex numbers $\mathbb{C}$. We call $\mathcal F$ uniformly bounded if there exists a real number $M>0$ such that

$$|f_i(x)|\le M \ , \qquad \forall i \in I \ , \quad \forall x \in X.$$

Another way of stating this would be the following:

$$\exists M>0: \quad \sup\limits_{i \in I} \sup\limits_{x \in X} |f_i(x)|\le M.$$

=== Metric space ===
In general let $Y$ be a metric space with metric $d$, then the set

$$\mathcal F=\{f_i: X \to Y, i\in I\}$$

is called uniformly bounded if there exists an element $a\in Y$ and $M\in\mathbb{R}^+$ such that

$$d(f_i(x), a) \le M \qquad \forall i \in I \quad \forall x \in X.$$

Another way of stating this would be the following:

$$\exists a\in Y\,, \exists M\in\mathbb{R}^{+}: \quad \sup\limits_{i \in I} \sup\limits_{x \in X} d(f_i(x), a) \le M.$$

== Examples ==
- Every uniformly convergent sequence of bounded functions is uniformly bounded.
- The family of functions $f_n(x)=\sin nx$ defined for real $x$ with $n$ traveling through the integers, is uniformly bounded by 1.
- The family of derivatives of the above family, $f'_n(x)=n\, \cos nx,$ is not uniformly bounded. Each $f'_n$ is bounded by $|n|,$ but there is no real number $M$ such that $|n|\le M$ for all integers $n.$
