= Partition of an interval =

Increasing sequence of numbers that span an interval

A partition of an interval being used in a Riemann sum. The partition itself is shown in grey at the bottom, with the norm of the partition indicated in red.

In mathematics, a partition of an interval [a, b] on the real line is a finite sequence x_{0}, x_{1}, x_{2}, …, x_{n} of real numbers such that

a = x_{0} < x_{1} < x_{2} < … < x_{n} = b.

In other terms, a partition of a compact interval I is a strictly increasing sequence of numbers (belonging to the interval I itself) starting from the initial point of I and arriving at the final point of I.

Every interval of the form [x_{i}, x_{i + 1}] is referred to as a subinterval of the partition x.

== Refinement of a partition ==
Another partition Q of the given interval [a, b] is defined as a refinement of the partition P, if Q contains all the points of P and possibly some other points as well; the partition Q is said to be “finer” than P. Given two partitions, P and Q, one can always form their common refinement, denoted P ∨ Q, which consists of all the points of P and Q, in increasing order.

== Norm of a partition ==
The norm (or mesh) of the partition

x_{0} < x_{1} < x_{2} < … < x_{n}

is the length of the longest of these subintervals

max{|x_{i} − x_{i−1}| : i = 1, … , n }.

== Applications ==
Partitions are used in the theory of the Riemann integral, the Riemann–Stieltjes integral and the regulated integral. Specifically, as finer partitions of a given interval are considered, their mesh approaches zero and the Riemann sum based on a given partition approaches the Riemann integral.

== Tagged partitions ==
A tagged partition or Perron Partition is a partition of a given interval together with a finite sequence of numbers t_{0}, …, t_{n − 1} subject to the conditions that for each i,

x_{i} ≤ t_{i} ≤ x_{i + 1}.

In other words, a tagged partition is a partition together with a distinguished point of every subinterval: its mesh is defined in the same way as for an ordinary partition.

== See also ==
- Regulated integral
- Riemann integral
- Riemann–Stieltjes integral
- Henstock–Kurzweil integral
