= Dirichlet function =

Indicator function of rational numbers

In mathematics, the Dirichlet function is the indicator function $\mathbf{1}_\Q$ of the set of rational numbers $\Q$ over the set of real numbers $\R$, i.e. $\mathbf{1}_\Q(x) = 1$ for a real number x if x is a rational number and $\mathbf{1}_\Q(x) = 0$ if x is not a rational number (i.e. is an irrational number).
$$\mathbf 1_\Q(x) = \begin{cases}
1 & x \in \Q \\
0 & x \notin \Q
\end{cases}$$

It is named after the mathematician Peter Gustav Lejeune Dirichlet. It is an example of a pathological function which provides counterexamples to many situations.

== Topological properties ==
- The Dirichlet function is nowhere continuous. We can prove this by reference to the definition of a continuous function to show that it violates the continuity properties at both rational and irrational arguments:
  Proof
  - If y is rational, then f(y) = 1. To show the function is not continuous at y, we need to find an ε such that no matter how small we choose δ, there will be points z within δ of y such that f(z) is not within ε of f(y) = 1. In fact, 1/2 is such an ε. Because the irrational numbers are dense in the reals, no matter what δ we choose we can always find an irrational z within δ of y, and f(z) = 0 is at least 1/2 away from 1.
  - If y is irrational, then f(y) = 0. Again, we can take ε = 1/2, and this time, because the rational numbers are dense in the reals, we can pick z to be a rational number as close to y as is required. Again, f(z) = 1 is more than 1/2 away from f(y) = 0.
  Its restrictions to the set of rational numbers and to the set of irrational numbers are constants and therefore continuous. The Dirichlet function is an archetypal example of the Blumberg theorem.
- The Dirichlet function can be constructed as the double pointwise limit of a sequence of continuous functions, as follows:
  $$\forall x \in \R, \quad \mathbf{1}_{\Q}(x) = \lim_{k \to \infty} \left(\lim_{j\to\infty}\left(\cos(k!\pi x)\right)^{2j}\right)$$
  for integer j and k. This shows that the Dirichlet function is a Baire class 2 function. It cannot be a Baire class 1 function because a Baire class 1 function can only be discontinuous on a meagre set.

== Periodicity ==
For any real number x and any positive rational number T, $\mathbf{1}_\Q(x + T) = \mathbf{1}_\Q(x)$. The Dirichlet function is therefore an example of a real periodic function which is not constant but whose set of periods, the set of rational numbers, is a dense subset of $\R$.

== Integration properties ==
- The Dirichlet function is not Riemann-integrable on any segment of $\R$ despite being bounded because the set of its discontinuity points is not negligible (for the Lebesgue measure).
- The Dirichlet function has both an upper Darboux integral (namely, $b-a$) and a lower Darboux integral (0) over any bounded interval $[a,b]$ — but they are not equal if $a < b$, so the Dirichlet function is not Darboux-integrable (and therefore not Riemann-integrable) over any nondegenerate interval.
- The Dirichlet function provides a counterexample showing that the monotone convergence theorem is not true in the context of the Riemann integral.
  Proof
  Using an enumeration of the rational numbers between 0 and 1, we define the function f_{n} (for all nonnegative integer n) as the indicator function of the set of the first n terms of this sequence of rational numbers. The increasing sequence of functions f_{n} (which are nonnegative, Riemann-integrable with a vanishing integral) pointwise converges to the Dirichlet function which is not Riemann-integrable.
- The Dirichlet function is Lebesgue-integrable on $\R$ and its integral over $\R$ is zero because it is zero except on the set of rational numbers which is negligible (for the Lebesgue measure).

== See also ==
- Thomae's function, a variation that is discontinuous only at the rational numbers.
