= Bounded function =

Mathematical function whose set of values is bounded

A schematic illustration of a bounded function (red) and an unbounded one (blue). Intuitively, the graph of a bounded function stays within a horizontal band, while the graph of an unbounded function does not.

In mathematics, a function $f$ defined on some set $X$ with real or complex values is called bounded if the set of its values (its image) is bounded. In other words, there exists a real number $M$ such that

$$|f(x)|\le M$$

for all $x$ in $X$. A function that is not bounded is said to be unbounded.

If $f$ is real-valued and $f(x) \leq A$ for all $x$ in $X$, then the function is said to be bounded (from) above by $A$. If $f(x) \geq B$ for all $x$ in $X$, then the function is said to be bounded (from) below by $B$. A real-valued function is bounded if and only if it is bounded from above and below.

An important special case is a bounded sequence, where $X$ is taken to be the set $\mathbb N$ of natural numbers. Thus a sequence $f = (a_0, a_1, a_2, \ldots)$ is bounded if there exists a real number $M$ such that

$$|a_n|\le M$$

for every natural number $n$. The set of all bounded sequences forms the sequence space $l^\infty$.

The definition of boundedness can be generalized to functions $f: X \rightarrow Y$ taking values in a more general space $Y$ by requiring that the image $f(X)$ is a bounded set in $Y$.

== Related notions ==
Weaker than boundedness is local boundedness. A family of bounded functions may be uniformly bounded.

A bounded operator $T: X \rightarrow Y$ is not a bounded function in the sense of this page's definition (unless $T=0$), but has the weaker property of preserving boundedness; bounded sets $M \subseteq X$ are mapped to bounded sets $T(M) \subseteq Y$. This definition can be extended to any function $f: X \rightarrow Y$ if $X$ and $Y$ allow for the concept of a bounded set. Boundedness can also be determined by looking at a graph.

== Examples ==
- The sine function $\sin: \mathbb R \rightarrow \mathbb R$ is bounded since $|\sin (x)| \le 1$ for all $x \in \mathbb{R}$.
- The function $f(x)=(x^2-1)^{-1}$, defined for all real $x$ except for −1 and 1, is unbounded. As $x$ approaches −1 or 1, the values of this function get larger in magnitude. This function can be made bounded if one restricts its domain to be, for example, $[2, \infty)$ or $(-\infty, -2]$.
- The function $f(x)= (x^2+1)^{-1}$, defined for all real $x$, is bounded, since $|f(x)| \le 1$ for all $x$.
- The inverse trigonometric function arctangent defined as: $y= \arctan (x)$ or $x = \tan (y)$ is increasing for all real numbers $x$ and bounded with $-\frac{\pi}{2} < y < \frac{\pi}{2}$ radians
- By the boundedness theorem, every continuous function on a closed interval, such as $f: [0, 1] \rightarrow \mathbb R$, is bounded. More generally, any continuous function from a compact space into a metric space is bounded.
- All complex-valued functions $f: \mathbb C \rightarrow \mathbb C$ which are entire are either unbounded or constant as a consequence of Liouville's theorem. In particular, the complex $\sin: \mathbb C \rightarrow \mathbb C$ must be unbounded since it is entire.
- The function $f$ which takes the value 0 for $x$ rational number and 1 for $x$ irrational number (cf. Dirichlet function) is bounded. Thus, a function does not need to be "nice" in order to be bounded. The set of all bounded functions defined on $[0, 1]$ is much larger than the set of continuous functions on that interval. Moreover, continuous functions need not be bounded; for example, the functions $g:\mathbb{R}^2\to\mathbb{R}$ and $h: (0, 1)^2\to\mathbb{R}$ defined by $g(x, y) := x + y$ and $h(x, y) := \frac{1}{x+y}$ are both continuous, but neither is bounded. (However, a continuous function must be bounded if its domain is both closed and bounded.)

== See also ==
- Bounded set
- Compact support
- Local boundedness
- Uniform boundedness
