= Baire set =

In mathematics, more specifically in measure theory, the Baire sets form a σ-algebra of a topological space that avoids some of the pathological properties of Borel sets.

There are several inequivalent definitions of Baire sets, but in the most widely used, the Baire sets of a locally compact Hausdorff space form the smallest σ-algebra such that all compactly supported continuous functions are measurable. Thus, measures defined on this σ-algebra, called Baire measures, are a convenient framework for integration on locally compact Hausdorff spaces. In particular, any compactly supported continuous function on such a space is integrable with respect to any finite Baire measure.

Every Baire set is a Borel set. The converse holds in many, but not all, topological spaces. Baire sets avoid some pathological properties of Borel sets on spaces without a countable base for the topology. In practice, the use of Baire measures on Baire sets can often be replaced by the use of regular Borel measures on Borel sets.

Baire sets were introduced by Kunihiko Kodaira (1941, Definition 4), Shizuo Kakutani and Kunihiko Kodaira (1944) and Halmos (1950, page 220), who named them after Baire functions, which are in turn named after René-Louis Baire.

== Basic definitions ==
There are at least three inequivalent definitions of Baire sets on locally compact Hausdorff spaces, and even more definitions for general topological spaces, though all these definitions are equivalent for locally compact σ-compact Hausdorff spaces. Moreover, some authors add restrictions on the topological space that Baire sets are defined on, and only define Baire sets on spaces that are compact Hausdorff, or locally compact Hausdorff, or σ-compact.

=== First definition ===
Kunihiko Kodaira defined what we call Baire sets (although he confusingly calls them "Borel sets") of certain topological spaces to be the sets whose characteristic function is a Baire function (the smallest class of functions containing all continuous real-valued functions and closed under pointwise limits of sequences). Dudley (1989, Sect. 7.1) gives an equivalent definition and defines Baire sets of a topological space to be elements of the smallest σ-algebra such that all continuous real-valued functions are measurable. For locally compact σ-compact Hausdorff spaces this is equivalent to the following definitions, but in general the definitions are not equivalent.

Conversely, the Baire functions are exactly the real-valued functions that are Baire measurable. For metric spaces, the Baire sets coincide with the Borel sets.

=== Second definition ===
Halmos (1950, page 220) defined Baire sets of a locally compact Hausdorff space to be the elements of the σ-ring generated by the compact G_{δ} sets. This definition is no longer used much, as σ-rings are somewhat out of fashion. When the space is σ-compact, this definition is equivalent to the next definition.

One reason for working with compact G_{δ} sets rather than closed G_{δ} sets is that Baire measures are then automatically regular (Halmos 1950, theorem G page 228).

=== Third definition ===
The third and most widely used definition is similar to Halmos's definition, modified so that the Baire sets form a σ-algebra rather than just a σ-ring.

A subset of a locally compact Hausdorff topological space is called a Baire set if it is a member of the smallest σ–algebra containing all compact G_{δ} sets. In other words, the σ–algebra of Baire sets is the σ–algebra generated by all those intersections of countably many open sets that yield a compact set. Alternatively, Baire sets form the smallest σ-algebra such that all continuous functions of compact support are measurable (at least on locally compact Hausdorff spaces; on general topological spaces these two conditions need not be equivalent).

For σ-compact spaces this is equivalent to Halmos's definition. For spaces that are not σ-compact the Baire sets under this definition are those under Halmos's definition together with their complements. However, in this case it is no longer true that a finite Baire measure is necessarily regular: for example, the Baire probability measure that assigns measure 0 to every countable subset of an uncountable discrete space and measure 1 to every co-countable subset is a Baire probability measure that is not regular.

== Examples ==
=== The different definitions of Baire sets are not equivalent ===
For locally compact Hausdorff topological spaces that are not σ-compact the three definitions above need not be equivalent.

A discrete topological space is locally compact and Hausdorff. Any function defined on a discrete space is continuous, and therefore, according to the first definition, all subsets of a discrete space are Baire. However, since the compact subspaces of a discrete space are precisely the finite subspaces, the Baire sets, according to the second definition, are precisely the at most countable sets, while according to the third definition the Baire sets are the at most countable sets and their complements. Thus, the three definitions are non-equivalent on an uncountable discrete space.

For non-Hausdorff spaces the definitions of Baire sets in terms of continuous functions need not be equivalent to definitions involving G_{δ} compact sets. For example, if X is an infinite countable set whose closed sets are the finite sets and the whole space, then the only continuous real functions on X are constant, but all subsets of X are in the σ-algebra generated by compact closed G_{δ} sets.

=== A Borel set that is not a Baire set ===
In a Cartesian product of uncountably many compact Hausdorff spaces with more than one point, a point is never a Baire set, in spite of the fact that it is closed, and therefore a Borel set.

== Properties ==
Baire sets coincide with Borel sets in Euclidean spaces.

For every compact Hausdorff space, every finite Baire measure (that is, a measure on the σ-algebra of all Baire sets) is regular.

For every compact Hausdorff space, every finite Baire measure has a unique extension to a regular Borel measure.

The Kolmogorov extension theorem states that every consistent collection of finite-dimensional probability distributions leads to a Baire measure on the space of functions. Assuming compactness (of the given space, and therefore also the function space) one may extend it to a regular Borel measure. After completion one gets a probability space that is not necessarily standard.
