= Nowhere continuous function =

Function which is not continuous at any point of its domain

In mathematics, a nowhere continuous function, also called an everywhere discontinuous function, is a function that is not continuous at any point of its domain. If $f$ is a function from real numbers to real numbers, then $f$ is nowhere continuous if for each point $x$ there is some $\varepsilon > 0$ such that for every $\delta > 0,$ we can find a point $y$ such that $|x - y| < \delta$ and $|f(x) - f(y)| \geq \varepsilon$. Therefore, no matter how close it gets to any fixed point, there are even closer points at which the function takes not-nearby values.

More general definitions of this kind of function can be obtained, by replacing the absolute value by the distance function in a metric space, or by using the definition of continuity in a topological space.

== Examples ==
=== Dirichlet function ===
One example of such a function is the indicator function of the rational numbers, also known as the Dirichlet function. This function is denoted as $\mathbf{1}_\Q$ and has domain and codomain both equal to the real numbers. By definition, $\mathbf{1}_\Q(x)$ is equal to $1$ if $x$ is a rational number and it is $0$ otherwise.

More generally, if $E$ is any subset of a topological space $X$ such that both $E$ and the complement of $E$ are dense in $X,$ then the real-valued function which takes the value $1$ on $E$ and $0$ on the complement of $E$ will be nowhere continuous. Functions of this type were originally investigated by Peter Gustav Lejeune Dirichlet.

=== Non-trivial additive functions ===
A function $f : \Reals \to \Reals$ is called an additive function if it satisfies Cauchy's functional equation:
$$f(x + y) = f(x) + f(y) \quad \text{ for all } x, y \in \Reals.$$
For example, every map of form $x \mapsto c x,$ where $c \in \Reals$ is some constant, is additive (in fact, it is linear and continuous). Furthermore, every linear map $L : \Reals \to \Reals$ is of this form (by taking $c := L(1)$).

Although every linear map is additive, not all additive maps are linear. An additive map $f : \Reals \to \Reals$ is linear if and only if there exists a point at which it is continuous, in which case it is continuous everywhere. Consequently, every non-linear additive function $\Reals \to \Reals$ is discontinuous at every point of its domain. Nevertheless, the restriction of any additive function $f : \Reals \to \Reals$ to any real scalar multiple of the rational numbers $\Q$ is continuous; explicitly, this means that for every real $r \in \Reals,$ the restriction $f\big\vert_{r \Q} : r \, \Q \to \Reals$ to the set $r \, \Q := \{r q : q \in \Q\}$ is a continuous function. Thus if $f : \Reals \to \Reals$ is a non-linear additive function then for every point $x \in \Reals,$ $f$ is discontinuous at $x$ but $x$ is also contained in some dense subset $D \subseteq \Reals$ on which $f$'s restriction $f\vert_D : D \to \Reals$ is continuous (specifically, take $D := x \, \Q$ if $x \neq 0,$ and take $D := \Q$ if $x = 0$).

=== Discontinuous linear maps ===
A linear map between two topological vector spaces, such as normed spaces for example, is continuous (everywhere) if and only if there exists a point at which it is continuous, in which case it is even uniformly continuous. Consequently, every linear map is either continuous everywhere or else continuous nowhere. Every linear functional is a linear map and on every infinite-dimensional normed space, there exists some discontinuous linear functional.

=== Other functions ===
Conway's base 13 function is discontinuous at every point.

== Hyperreal characterisation ==
A real function $f$ is nowhere continuous if its natural hyperreal extension has the property that every $x$ is infinitely close to a $y$ such that the difference $f(x) - f(y)$ is appreciable (that is, not infinitesimal).

== See also ==
- Blumberg theorem – even if a real function $f : \Reals \to \Reals$ is nowhere continuous, there is a dense subset $D$ of $\Reals$ such that the restriction of $f$ to $D$ is continuous.
- Thomae's function (also known as the popcorn function) – a function that is continuous at all irrational numbers and discontinuous at all rational numbers.
- Weierstrass function (nowhere-differentiable function) – a function continuous everywhere (inside its domain) and differentiable nowhere.
