= Integrability =

In mathematics, the concept of integrability may refer to:

- Bronshtein-integrability (informal)
- Frobenius integrability
- Riemann-integrability
- Lebesgue-integrability; see Lebesgue integral
- Liouville-integrability
- Darboux-integrability
- Integrable system

== See also ==
- System integration (information technology)
- Interoperability (information technology)
