= Lebesgue integrability =

In mathematics, Lebesgue integrability may refer to:

- Whether the Lebesgue integral of a function is defined; this is what is most often meant.
- The Lebesgue integrability condition, which determines whether the Riemann integral of a function is defined. Confusingly, this result is due to Lebesgue, but refers to the Riemann integral, not the Lebesgue integral.
