= Daniell integral =

Type of integration

In mathematics, the Daniell integral is a type of integration that generalizes the concept of more elementary versions such as the Riemann integral to which students are typically first introduced. One of the main difficulties with the traditional formulation of the Lebesgue integral is that it requires the initial development of a workable measure theory before any useful results for the integral can be obtained. However, an alternative approach is available, developed by Percy J. Daniell (1918) that does not suffer from this deficiency, and has a few significant advantages over the traditional formulation, especially as the integral is generalized into higher-dimensional spaces and further generalizations such as the Stieltjes integral. The basic idea involves the axiomatization of the integral.

== Axioms ==
We start by choosing a family $H$ of bounded real functions (called elementary functions) defined over some set $X$, that satisfies these two axioms:

- $H$ is a linear space with the usual operations of addition and scalar multiplication.
- If a function $h$ is in $H$, so is its absolute value $|h|: x \mapsto |h(x)|$.

In addition, every function $h$ in $H$ is assigned a real number $Ih$, which is called the elementary integral of $h$, satisfying these three axioms:

Linearity
If $h$ and $k$ are both in H, and $\alpha$ and $\beta$ are any two real numbers, then $I(\alpha h + \beta k) = \alpha Ih + \beta Ik$.
Nonnegativity
If $h(x) \ge 0$ for all $x$, then $Ih \ge 0$.
Continuity
If $h_n$ is a nonincreasing sequence (i.e. $h_1 \ge \cdots \ge h_k \ge \cdots$) of functions in $H$ that converges to 0 for all $x$ in $X$, then $Ih_n \to 0$.
or (more commonly)
If $h_n$ is an increasing sequence (i.e. $h_1 \le \cdots \le h_k \le \cdots$) of functions in $H$ that converges to $h$ for all $x$ in $X$, then $Ih_n \to Ih$.

That is, we define a continuous non-negative linear functional $I$ over the space of elementary functions.

These elementary functions and their elementary integrals may be any set of functions and definitions of integrals over these functions which satisfy these axioms. The family of all step functions evidently satisfies the above axioms for elementary functions. Defining the elementary integral of the family of step functions as the (signed) area underneath a step function evidently satisfies the given axioms for an elementary integral. Applying the construction of the Daniell integral described further below using step functions as elementary functions produces a definition of an integral equivalent to the Lebesgue integral. Using the family of all continuous functions as the elementary functions and the traditional Riemann integral as the elementary integral is also possible, however, this will yield an integral that is also equivalent to Lebesgue's definition. Doing the same, but using the Riemann–Stieltjes integral, along with an appropriate function of bounded variation, gives a definition of integral equivalent to the Lebesgue–Stieltjes integral.

Sets of measure zero may be defined in terms of elementary functions as follows. A set $Z$ which is a subset of $X$ is a set of measure zero if for any $\epsilon > 0$, there exists a nondecreasing sequence of nonnegative elementary functions $h_p(x)$ in $H$ such that $Ih_p < \varepsilon$ and $\sup_p h_p(x) \ge 1$ on $Z$.

A set is called a set of full measure if its complement, relative to $X$, is a set of measure zero. We say that if some property holds at every point of a set of full measure (or equivalently everywhere except on a set of measure zero), it holds almost everywhere.

== Definition ==
Although the result is the same, different authors construct the integral differently. A common approach is to start with defining a larger class of functions, based on our chosen elementary functions, the class $L^+$, which is the family of all functions that are the limit of a nondecreasing sequence $h_n$ of elementary functions, such that the set of integrals $Ih_n$ is bounded. The integral of a function $f$ in $L^+$ is defined as:

$$If = \lim_{n \to \infty} Ih_n$$

It can be shown that this definition of the integral is well-defined, i.e. it does not depend on the choice of sequence $h_n$.

However, the class $L^+$ is in general not closed under subtraction and scalar multiplication by negative numbers; one needs to further extend it by defining a wider class of functions $L$ with these properties.

Daniell's (1918) method, described in the book by Royden, amounts to defining the upper integral of a general function $\phi$ by

$$I^+\phi = \inf_{f \ge \phi} If.$$

The lower integral is defined in a similar fashion or, in short, as $I^-\phi = -I^+(-\phi)$. Finally $L$ consists of those functions whose upper and lower integrals are finite and coincide, and

$$\int_X \phi(x) dx = I^+\phi = I^-\phi.$$

An alternative route, based on a discovery by Frederic Riesz, is taken in the book by Shilov and Gurevich and in the article in Encyclopedia of Mathematics. Here $L$ consists of those functions $\phi(x)$ that can be represented on a set of full measure (defined in the previous section) as the difference $\phi = f - g$, for some functions $f$ and $g$ in the class $L^+$. Then the integral of a function $\phi(x)$ can be defined as:

$$\int_X \phi(x) dx = If - Ig\,$$

Again, it may be shown that this integral is well-defined, i.e. it does not depend on the decomposition of $\phi$ into $f$ and $g$. This turns out to be equivalent to the original Daniell integral.

== Properties ==
Nearly all of the important theorems in the traditional theory of the Lebesgue integral, such as Lebesgue's dominated convergence theorem, the Riesz–Fischer theorem, Fatou's lemma, and Fubini's theorem may also readily be proved using this construction. Its properties are identical to the traditional Lebesgue integral.

== Measurement ==
Because of the natural correspondence between sets and functions, it is also possible to use the Daniell integral to construct a measure theory. If we take the characteristic function $\chi(x)$ of some set, then its integral may be taken as the measure of the set. This definition of measure based on the Daniell integral can be shown to be equivalent to the traditional Lebesgue measure.

== Advantages over the traditional formulation ==
This method of constructing the general integral has a few advantages over the traditional method of Lebesgue, particularly in the field of functional analysis. The Lebesgue and Daniell constructions are equivalent, as pointed out above, if ordinary finite-valued step functions are chosen as elementary functions. However, as one tries to extend the definition of the integral into more complex domains (e.g. attempting to define the integral of a linear functional), one runs into practical difficulties using Lebesgue's construction that are alleviated with the Daniell approach.

The Polish mathematician Jan Mikusiński has made an alternative and more natural formulation of Daniell integration by using the notion of absolutely convergent series. His formulation works for the Bochner integral (the Lebesgue integral for mappings taking values in Banach spaces). Mikusiński's lemma allows one to define the integral without mentioning null sets. He also proved the change of variables theorem for multiple Bochner integrals and Fubini's theorem for Bochner integrals using Daniell integration. The book by Asplund and Bungart carries a lucid treatment of this approach for real valued functions. It also offers a proof of the abstract Radon–Nikodym theorem using the Daniell–Mikusiński approach.

== See also ==
- Lebesgue integral
- Riemann integral
- Lebesgue–Stieltjes integration
