= Jan Mikusiński =

Polish mathematician

Jan Mikusiński (April 3, 1913 – July 27, 1987) was a Polish mathematician based at the University of Wrocław known for his pioneering work in mathematical analysis.

Mikusiński was born in Stanisławów in 1913 and developed an operational calculus, known as the Calculus of Mikusiński (MSC 44A40), which is relevant for solving differential equations. His operational calculus is based upon an algebra of the convolution of functions with respect to the Fourier transform. From the convolution product he goes on to define what in other contexts is called the field of fractions or a quotient field. These ordered pairs of functions Mikusiński calls "operators", the "Mikusiński operators".

He is also well known for Mikusinski's cube, the Antosik–Mikusinski theorem, and Mikusinski convolution algebra.

Mikusiński died in Katowice in 1987. A street in Katowice is named after him.

== Selected publications ==
- An Introduction to Analysis - From Number to Integral. Wiley 1993
- The Operational Calculus. Pergamon Press, Oxford 1983
- Operatorenrechnung. VEB Deutscher Verlag der Wissenschaften, Berlin 1957.
- The Bochner Integral. Birkhäuser 1978.
- with Piotr Antosik, Roman Sikorski: Theory of distributions – the sequential approach. Elsevier 1973.
- with Stanisław Hartman: The theory of Lebesgue Measure and Integration. Pergamon Press, Oxford 1961.

== See also ==
- Convolution quotient
- Daniell integral
