= Lebesgue–Stieltjes integration =

Lebesgue-Stieltjes integration

In measure-theoretic analysis and related branches of mathematics, Lebesgue–Stieltjes integration generalizes both Riemann–Stieltjes and Lebesgue integration, preserving the many advantages of the former in a more general measure-theoretic framework. The Lebesgue–Stieltjes integral is the ordinary Lebesgue integral with respect to a measure known as the Lebesgue–Stieltjes measure, which may be associated to any function of bounded variation on the real line. The Lebesgue–Stieltjes measure is a regular Borel measure, and conversely every regular Borel measure on the real line is of this kind.

Lebesgue–Stieltjes integrals, named for Henri Leon Lebesgue and Thomas Joannes Stieltjes, are also known as Lebesgue–Radon integrals or just Radon integrals, after Johann Radon, to whom much of the theory is due. They find common application in probability and stochastic processes, and in certain branches of analysis including potential theory.

== Definition ==
The Lebesgue–Stieltjes integral

$$\int_a^b f(x)\,dg(x)$$

is defined when $f : \left[a, b\right] \rightarrow \mathbb R$ is Borel-measurable and bounded and $g : \left[a, b\right] \rightarrow \mathbb R$ is of bounded variation in [a, b] and right-continuous, or when f is non-negative and g is monotone and right-continuous. To start, assume that f is non-negative and g is monotone non-decreasing and right-continuous. Define w((s, t]) = g(t) − g(s) and w({a}) = 0. (Alternatively, the construction works for g left-continuous, w([s,t)) = g(t) − g(s) and w({b}) = 0.)

By Carathéodory's extension theorem, there is a unique Borel measure μ_{g} on [a, b] which agrees with w on every interval I. The measure μ_{g} arises from an outer measure (in fact, a metric outer measure) given by

$$\mu_g(E) = \inf\left\{\sum_i \mu_g(I_i) \ : \  E\subseteq \bigcup_i I_i \right\}$$

the infimum taken over all coverings of E by countably many semiopen intervals. This measure is sometimes called the Lebesgue–Stieltjes measure associated with g.

The Lebesgue–Stieltjes integral

$$\int_a^b f(x)\,dg(x)$$

is defined as the Lebesgue integral of f with respect to the measure μ_{g} in the usual way. If g is non-increasing, then define

$$\int_a^b f(x)\,dg(x) := -\int_a^b f(x) \,d (-g)(x),$$

the latter integral being defined by the preceding construction.

If g is of bounded variation, then it is possible to write

$$g(x)=g_1(x)-g_2(x)$$

where g_{1}(x) = V^{x}_{a}g is the total variation of g in the interval [a, x], and g_{2}(x) = g_{1}(x) − g(x). Both g_{1} and g_{2} are monotone non-decreasing.

Now, if f is bounded, the Lebesgue–Stieltjes integral of f with respect to g is defined by

$$\int_a^b f(x)\,dg(x) = \int_a^b f(x)\,dg_1(x)-\int_a^b f(x)\,dg_2(x),$$

where the latter two integrals are well-defined by the preceding construction.

=== Daniell integral ===
An alternative approach (Hewitt & Stromberg 1965) is to define the Lebesgue–Stieltjes integral as the Daniell integral that extends the usual Riemann–Stieltjes integral. Let g be a non-decreasing right-continuous function on [a, b], and define I( f ) to be the Riemann–Stieltjes integral

$$I(f) = \int_a^b f(x)\,dg(x)$$

for all continuous functions f . The functional I defines a Radon measure on [a, b]. This functional can then be extended to the class of all non-negative functions by setting

$$\begin{align}
\overline{I}(h) &= \sup \left \{I(f) \ : \ f\in C[a,b], 0\le f\le h \right \} \\
\overline{\overline{I}}(h) &= \inf \left \{I(f) \ : \ f \in C[a,b], h\le f \right \}.
\end{align}$$

For Borel measurable functions, one has

$$\overline{I}(h) = \overline{\overline{I}}(h),$$

and either side of the identity then defines the Lebesgue–Stieltjes integral of h. The outer measure μ_{g} is defined via

$$\mu_g(A) := \overline{I}(\chi_A)= \overline{\overline{I}}(\chi_A)$$

where χ_{A} is the indicator function of A.

Integrators of bounded variation are handled as above by decomposing into positive and negative variations.

== Example ==
Suppose that γ : [a, b] → R^{2} is a rectifiable curve in the plane and ρ : R^{2} → [0, ∞) is Borel measurable. Then we may define the length of γ with respect to the Euclidean metric weighted by ρ to be

$$\int_a^b \rho(\gamma(t))\,d\ell(t),$$

where $\ell(t)$ is the length of the restriction of γ to [a, t]. This is sometimes called the ρ-length of γ. This notion is quite useful for various applications: for example, in muddy terrain the speed in which a person can move may depend on how deep the mud is. If ρ(z) denotes the inverse of the walking speed at or near z, then the ρ-length of γ is the time it would take to traverse γ. The concept of extremal length uses this notion of the ρ-length of curves and is useful in the study of conformal mappings.

== Integration by parts ==
A function f is said to be "regular" at a point a if the right and left hand limits f (a+) and f (a−) exist, and the function takes at a the average value

$$f(a)=\frac{f(a-)+f(a+)}{2}.$$

Given two functions U and V of finite variation, if at each point either at least one of U or V is continuous or U and V are both regular, then an integration by parts formula for the Lebesgue–Stieltjes integral holds:

$$\int_a^b U\,dV+\int_a^b V\,dU = U(b+)V(b+)-U(a-)V(a-), \qquad -\infty < a < b < \infty.$$

Here the relevant Lebesgue–Stieltjes measures are associated with the right-continuous versions of the functions U and V; that is, to $\tilde U(x) = \lim_{t\to x^+} U(t)$ and similarly $\tilde V(x).$ The bounded interval (a, b) may be replaced with an unbounded interval (-∞, b), (a, ∞) or (-∞, ∞) provided that U and V are of finite variation on this unbounded interval. Complex-valued functions may be used as well.

An alternative result, of significant importance in the theory of stochastic calculus is the following. Given two functions U and V of finite variation, which are both right-continuous and have left-limits (they are càdlàg functions) then

$$U(t)V(t) = U(0)V(0) + \int_{(0,t]} U(s-)\,dV(s)+\int_{(0,t]} V(s-)\,dU(s)+\sum_{u\in (0,t]} \Delta U_u \Delta V_u,$$

where ΔU_{t} = U(t) − U(t−). This result can be seen as a precursor to Itô's lemma, and is of use in the general theory of stochastic integration. The final term is ΔU(t)ΔV(t) = d[U, V],which arises from the quadratic covariation of U and V. (The earlier result can then be seen as a result pertaining to the Stratonovich integral.)

== Related concepts ==
=== Lebesgue integration ===
When g(x) = x for all real x, then μ_{g} is the Lebesgue measure, and the Lebesgue–Stieltjes integral of f with respect to g is equivalent to the Lebesgue integral of f .

=== Riemann–Stieltjes integration and probability theory ===
Where f is a continuous real-valued function of a real variable and v is a non-decreasing real function, the Lebesgue–Stieltjes integral is equivalent to the Riemann–Stieltjes integral, in which case we often write

$$\int_a^b f(x) \, dv(x)$$

for the Lebesgue–Stieltjes integral, letting the measure μ_{v} remain implicit. This is particularly common in probability theory when v is the cumulative distribution function of a real-valued random variable X, in which case

$$\int_{-\infty}^\infty f(x) \, dv(x) = \mathrm{E}[f(X)].$$

(See the article on Riemann–Stieltjes integration for more detail on dealing with such cases.)

== See also ==
Henstock-Kurzweil-Stiltjes Integral
