= Real analysis =

Mathematics of real numbers and real functions

The least-upper-bound property (completeness) of the real numbers, that every non-empty bounded above subset has a supremum, is fundamental in real analysis.

Real analysis is the part of mathematical analysis, especially as taught in undergraduate and graduate courses, that develops calculus rigorously over the real numbers and Euclidean spaces. Introductory real analysis is sometimes called advanced calculus, and studies limits, continuity, compactness, differentiation, integration, and series. More advanced courses often include measure theory, Lebesgue integration, and function spaces. Real analysis is also known, especially in older books, as the theory of functions of a real variable, in contrast to the theory of complex variables.

== Scope ==
=== Real numbers ===
The real numbers are the basic setting of real analysis, which begins with their construction. The real numbers are distinguished from the rational numbers by their completeness. Roughly speaking, the real numbers have no gaps. This completeness can be formalized in several equivalent ways, one of which is the least upper bound property. This states that if a non-empty set of real numbers is bounded above, meaning that all of its elements are less than some number (an upper bound), then there is a least upper bound, that is an upper bound that is smaller than all of the others.

Most of the theorems that are proved in real analysis rely on completeness in one way or another. Some examples where its relevance are most apparent are as follows. The convergence of bounded monotone sequences, that is sequences that are increasing (or decreasing), is essentially equivalent to the least upper bound property, stated in sequence form. Completeness is also reflected in the intermediate value theorem: the continuous image of an interval is again an interval, so continuous functions cannot create gaps.

=== Limits and convergence ===
The concept of a limit underlies many of the ideas of calculus, such as the derivative. It is therefore of fundamental importance in real analysis, which provides the rigorous justification for calculus. Limits describe how a sequence, function, or family of functions behave under a limiting process, such as letting an index tend to infinity, or a letting point become very large or approach another point. The formal language of limits defines continuity, differentiation, integration, infinite series, and various kinds of approximations and asymptotics.

A recurring problem in real analysis is not just whether a limit exists, but how well one object approximates another. A convergent sequence approximates its limit, or a differentiable function is approximated by a linear function coming from the derivative. But real analysis can provide not only tools to justify the existence of these limits and how to calculate them, but also quantitative estimates of how good the approximation is. One example of this is the Taylor remainder, which gives an effective and computable constant that determines how well the linear approximation (or higher-order Taylor polynomial) approximates a function on an interval.

For sequences of functions, real analysis distinguishes between different modes of convergence. A sequence of functions converges pointwise if it converges at every point, but, roughly speaking, the rate of convergence may vary from point to point. It converges uniformly if it converges at all points at a comparable rate. Uniform convergence can be understood intuitively in terms of the graphs of the functions in the sequence: it means that, for any given thin error band around the limiting function, all but finitely many functions in the sequence stay within the band. Pointwise convergence means that this is true for an error band around each point, but the finite set of functions which must be excluded varies from point to point.

For sequences of functions, pointwise convergence often fails to preserve operations on the limit function. For example, it is not generally true that the pointwise limit of a sequence of continuous functions is continuous, or that the integral of the functions in a sequence passes to the integral of the limit function. But the uniform limit of continuous functions is continuous, and one can exchange integration and uniform limits on suitable domains. Uniform convergence is therefore important for many applications of real analysis. Questions such as "when is differentiation under the integral allowed?" or "when can I integrate an infinite sum term-by-term?" are typical examples in which uniform convergence provides a simple answer.

=== Differentiation and regularity ===
Differentiation measures the local rate of change of a function. In one variable, the derivative gives the slope of the best linear approximation to a function near a point. This point of view extends to several variables, where differentiability is expressed in terms of approximation by a linear map.

In addition to proving rigorously the fundamental properties of the derivative from calculus, such as the chain rule, real analysis also establishes the main theorems about the derivative, such as the mean value theorem and some of its generalizations like the Cauchy mean value theorem. Roughly speaking, the mean value theorem relates the derivative of a function to its average rate of change over intervals. The mean value theorem is important because it leads to an effective way to estimate the error in certain approximations or averaging processes.

Real analysis studies not only existence of derivatives, but also degrees of regularity. A function may be continuous but nowhere differentiable, differentiable but not continuously differentiable, or smooth (having derivatives of all orders) but not analytic (equal to its Taylor series). One theorem that is sometimes shown at the elementary level is Darboux's theorem, that the derivative of a differentiable function satisfies the intermediate value property; weaker than continuity, but still a restricted class of functions. In more advanced analysis, regularity questions become central. The classical derivative turns out to be very inconvenient in many applications, such as to differential equations where many problems have a more natural variational formulation using integration rather than differentiation. The functions one must consider are often not differentiable, and so generalizations of differentiability, and even what constitutes a function, are considered. Regularity then involves questions about whether the generalized derivatives are honest derivatives, and how smooth solutions to equations are. This is a common theme in measure theory, partial differential equations, Sobolev spaces, and the calculus of variations.

=== Integration and measure ===
Integration in analysis gives rigorous meaning to averaging, accumulation, and area. The Riemann integral formalizes the integral using approximations by finite sums over intervals. The Riemann integral is put on a firm foundation in basic real analysis courses. The fundamental theorem of calculus, which relates integration and differentiation, is proved for the Riemann integral. The fundamental theorem underlies many exact computations in elementary integral calculus by reducing definite integrals to antiderivatives. The mean value theorem for integration states that the average value of a continuous function over an interval, defined by a Riemann integral, is equal to the value of the function at some point inside the interval. The mean value theorem is important in deriving analytic estimates in analytic applications; for example, one form of the Taylor remainder uses it.

The Lebesgue integral is introduced in more advanced real analysis. Instead of approximating the integral by finite sums using partitions of the domain, the Lebesgue integral partitions the range instead. While the idea is similar to the Riemann integral, it differs from the Riemann integral in that one must formulate the area of horizontal slabs that are not connected rectangles, but may be distributed over complicated sets in the domain. Thus formulating the Lebesgue integral leads naturally to measure theory, the fundamental question of which is how to measure subsets of the real line – that is, assign a notion of length – if the subsets are allowed to be very complicated.

One reason for the success of the Lebesgue integral in analysis is that it is more compatible with limiting processes. For example, under relatively mild hypotheses, the limit of the Lebesgue integrals of members of a sequence of functions that converges only pointwise is equal to the integral of the pointwise limit (dominated convergence theorem). Moreover, the Lebesgue integral admits a wider class of functions as integrable. The Riemann integral, although not widely used in mathematical analysis, still has its uses however: most numerical integration relies on the Riemann rather than Lebesgue approach to integration.

Measure theory treats length, area, volume, mass, and probability as instances of a general concept of measure. The theory allows one to identify functions that are equal except on a set of measure zero, and one says that such functions are equal almost everywhere. In probability theory, the relevant notion is almost surely. An example is tossing a fair coin an infinite sequence of times. It is possible that the coin could come up tails every time, but this event has zero probability: it can be essentially excluded from any probabilistic argument.

The monotone convergence theorem, Fatou's lemma, dominated convergence theorem, and Fubini's theorem are basic theorems about the Lebesgue integral. Measure-theoretic real analysis also supplies the language of probability and of many function spaces. In probability theory, expected values are integrals with respect to probability measures. In the theory of L^{p} spaces, functions are studied according to integrability properties and are identified when they agree almost everywhere.

=== Series, function sequences, and representation ===
Infinite series are one of the basic limiting processes of real analysis. A numerical series is defined by the convergence of its partial sums, and questions about its absolute convergence, conditional convergence, and rearrangements illustrate the difference between finite and infinite additions. Power series and Taylor series connect infinite series with differentiablity and analyticity.

Sequences and series are used to approximate and represent functions. Uniform convergence gives conditions under which continuity, integrability, and sometimes differentiability, pass to the limit function. Power series can be used to represent some functions locally, while Fourier series represent periodic functions in terms of trigonometric series. These lead from elementary analysis to questions of approximation theory (how well a function is represented by a series or partial sum), harmonic analysis (what can be inferred about the regularity of the function from its representations), and the theory of function spaces (what classes of functions can be represented, and how well, in a certain way).

=== Metric spaces and function spaces ===
Many of the theorems of real analysis can be formulated in metric spaces. Metric spaces generalize the real line and Euclidean spaces, in the sense that they have a notion of distance function defined on them that satisfies some natural rules. The basic theorems about limits and continuity carry through, essentially unchanged, in the more general setting, and so elementary treatments of the subject often describe this generalization. The generalizations to metric spaces are important in many areas of mathematics. One example of a metric space is a surface in Euclidean space. The analytic properties of metrics like this are similar to those of Euclidean space, and differential geometry involves the study of metric spaces like surfaces and their generalizations to higher dimensions. Other metric spaces in mathematics are very different from Euclidean spaces. In number theory for example, metric spaces are used to encode arithmetic information and invariants, a basic example of which is the p-adic numbers.

In real analysis proper, most of the examples of metric spaces other than Euclidean spaces are function spaces, that is spaces of functions that are defined by some property. In the basic examples considered in real analysis, these spaces of functions have a metric that comes from a norm. An example is the space of continuous functions on the unit interval, denoted $C([0,1])$. Given a real-valued function on the unit interval, the maximum absolute value of the function defines the norm. The metric is the maximum absolute difference between two functions. The notion of convergence that this metric defines is that of uniform convergence, so that the language of uniform convergence of continuous functions can be packaged into a single metric space. This is an example of a Banach space: the metric that this norm defines is complete, which is a consequence of a theorem that the uniform limit of continuous functions is continuous.

Another example of metric spaces appearing in real analysis, where the metric comes from a norm, is the space $L^1$ of Lebesgue integrable functions, and the distance function is the integral of the absolute value of the difference of two functions. (Here functions are regarded as the same if they differ on a set of measure zero.) Thus, on a finite domain, the distance between two functions is essentially the average distance between their values. Spaces of square integrable measurable functions form a metric space, where the norm is induced by an inner product. This inner product is complete: the square integrable functions are a Hilbert space. The L^{p} spaces are generalizations of these. The metrics one gets from the L^{p} spaces are complete: they are Banach spaces, with the usual identification of measurable functions that are equal almost everywhere.

These function spaces, while all being infinite dimensional vector spaces, and share similar kinds of convergence theorems because they are all metric spaces, are different both globally as spaces, and locally in terms of the fine structure that functions must carry for membership. Functional analysis is concerned with these spaces and their generalizations, their global and convergence properties. Harmonic analysis is concerned with the fine properties needed for membership, and to estimate how operators determined by fine structure behave in theses spaces: a typical question here is to characterize when the derivative of a function is in a certain L^{p} space, for example..

=== Completeness and compactness ===
Many applications of metric spaces to analysis rely on a metric space with extra properties that ensure that certain limits exist and belong to the space. One such property is whether a metric space is complete, and another is whether a metric space is compact.

Completeness of a space is formulated in terms of Cauchy sequences within it. A sequence in a space converges to a limit if all except finitely many of its members are arbitrarily close to the limit. Now, if a sequence converges, then all but finitely many of its members are close to the limit, and therefore must be close to one another. This property characterizes the Cauchy sequences in a metric space. Stated a little more carefully, a sequence is Cauchy if, for any error tolerance, all but finitely many members lie within that error tolerance of each other. A metric space is complete if every Cauchy sequence converges. The real numbers, for example, are complete in this sense.

One key theorem for complete metric spaces is the contraction mapping theorem. This theorem says that if a transformation $T$ of a complete space decreases distances between points by at least a factor of $C<1$, so that $\operatorname{dist}(Tx,Ty)\le C\operatorname{dist}(x,y)$, then the transformation has a unique fixed point, that is a point of the space such that $Tx=x$. This theorem is particularly important in differential equations, because it supplies the basic existence and uniqueness theorem for solutions of ordinary differential equations – the Picard existence theorem – as well as a method for converging to it – Picard iteration. Furthermore, it provides estimates of the rate of convergence, provided one can determine the contractivity constant $C$.

Another notion in metric spaces is compactness. A metric space is compact if every sequence has a convergent subsequence. Compact metric spaces are also complete, but compactness is useful for guaranteeing the existence of limits without needing to study a separate Cauchy condition. In basic real analysis, the Bolzano–Weierstrass theorem shows that a subset of Euclidean space is compact if and only if it is closed and bounded.

A more general notion of compactness applies to general topological spaces that are not necessarily metric spaces, and it is based on the idea that compact spaces should generalized finite sets. Finite sets have the property that whenever they are covered by a family of subsets, so that every member of the set belongs to some member of the cover, it is possible to cover the finite set with a finite subfamily. For example, one can pick from each element of the finite set one member of the covering family that contains it. A metric space is compact in this sense if every covering by open sets has a finite subcover. An example of a compact set in this sense is a closed interval $[a,b]$: whenever this set is covered by open intervals, it is possible to cover it with finitely many of the intervals. This can be shown by a straightforward application of the least upper bound property. A compact set in the real line can be shown to be bounded, by considering an open cover by intervals $(-n,n)$ and using a finite subcover to extract a bound. It can also be shown to be closed by a simple proof by contradiction. Another foundational result in real analysis is the Heine–Borel theorem, which states the converse to this: a subset of the real line (or Euclidean space, more generally) is compact in this sense if and only if it is closed and bounded.

Compactness plays an important role through its interaction with continuity. The extreme value theorem in calculus, for example, says that a continuous function on a closed interval $[a,b]$ attains both a maximum and minimum value. In real analysis, this generalizes: any continuous real-valued function on a compact metric space attains both a maximum and minimum value. This result is important in optimization theory because it guarantees the existence of maxima and minima, often in very general situations where compactness is present but one is no longer working on subsets of the real line (or other Euclidean space).

Another theorem in real analysis, relating to compactness and continuous functions, is the Arzelà–Ascoli theorem. It asserts that if a sequence of continuous functions on a compact metric space is uniformly bounded (all functions share a common upper and lower bound) and equicontinuous (all functions share a common modulus of continuity), then the sequence of functions has a uniformly convergent subsequence. This theorem has applications to differential equations, because it can be used to guarantee existence of solutions to differential equations where the stricter criteria of the Picard existence theorem do not hold. An example application is the Peano existence theorem. The Arzelà–Ascoli theorem is itself a kind of compactness assertion, characterizing compactness in the Banach space of functions on a compact metric space.

== Important results ==
Important elementary results put the techniques of calculus on rigorous footing. They include the Bolzano–Weierstrass and Heine–Borel theorems, L'Hopital's rule, the mean value theorem, Taylor's theorem, the fundamental theorem of calculus, and the extreme value theorem.

Other results, also taught in an elementary course, are motivated by applications, chiefly to differential equations, multivariable calculus, and Fourier analysis which are part of the undergraduate mathematics curriculum. They are the Arzelà-Ascoli theorem, the Stone-Weierstrass theorem, the Banach fixed-point theorem, the inverse and implicit function theorems, and Stokes' theorem.

More advanced graduate-level courses also cover the basics of measure theory, the basic theorems of which are: Egorov's theorem, Lusin's theorem, Fatou's lemma, the monotone and dominated convergence theorems, and Fubini's theorem.

Other advanced results are sometimes also covered at the graduate level, because these are motivated by applications to other areas in the graduate curriculum. They include the Radon–Nikodym theorem, Lebesgue decomposition theorem, and Riesz representation theorem. Sometimes results such as the Lebesgue differentiation theorem are also included, as applications of harmonic analysis to questions of real analysis.

== Generalizations and related areas of mathematics ==
Various ideas from real analysis can be generalized from the real line to broader or more abstract contexts. These generalizations link real analysis to other disciplines and subdisciplines. For instance, generalization of ideas like continuous functions and compactness from real analysis to metric spaces and topological spaces connects real analysis to the field of general topology, while generalization of finite-dimensional Euclidean spaces to infinite-dimensional analogs led to the concepts of Banach spaces and Hilbert spaces and, more generally to functional analysis. Georg Cantor's investigation of sets and sequence of real numbers, mappings between them, and the foundational issues of real analysis gave birth to naive set theory. The study of issues of convergence for sequences of functions eventually gave rise to Fourier analysis as a subdiscipline of mathematical analysis. Investigation of the consequences of generalizing differentiability from functions of a real variable to ones of a complex variable gave rise to the concept of holomorphic functions and the inception of complex analysis as another distinct subdiscipline of analysis. On the other hand, the generalization of integration from the Riemann sense to that of Lebesgue led to the formulation of the concept of abstract measure spaces, a fundamental concept in measure theory. Finally, the generalization of integration from the real line to curves and surfaces in higher dimensional space brought about the study of vector calculus, whose further generalization and formalization played an important role in the evolution of the concepts of differential forms and smooth (differentiable) manifolds in differential geometry and other closely related areas of geometry and topology.

=== Distributions ===
Distributions (or generalized functions) are objects that generalize functions. Distributions make it possible to differentiate functions whose derivatives do not exist in the classical sense. In particular, any locally integrable function has a distributional derivative.

=== Relation to complex analysis ===
Real analysis is an area of analysis that studies concepts such as sequences and their limits, continuity, differentiation, integration and sequences of functions. By definition, real analysis focuses on the real numbers, often including positive and negative infinity to form the extended real line. Real analysis is closely related to complex analysis, which studies broadly the same properties of complex numbers. In complex analysis, it is natural to define differentiation via holomorphic functions, which have a number of useful properties, such as repeated differentiability, expressibility as power series, and satisfying the Cauchy integral formula.

In real analysis, it is usually more natural to consider differentiable, smooth, or harmonic functions, which are more widely applicable, but may lack some more powerful properties of holomorphic functions. However, results such as the fundamental theorem of algebra are simpler when expressed in terms of complex numbers.

Techniques from the theory of analytic functions of a complex variable are often used in real analysis – such as evaluation of real integrals by residue calculus.

== See also ==
- List of real analysis topics
- Time-scale calculus – a unification of real analysis with calculus of finite differences
- Real multivariable function
- Real coordinate space
- Complex analysis
- Mathematical analysis

== Sources ==
- Abbott, Stephen (2015), Understanding Analysis, Undergraduate Texts in Mathematics (2nd ed.), New York: Springer, doi:10.1007/978-1-4939-2712-8, ISBN 978-1-4939-2711-1.
- Athreya, Krishna B.; Lahiri, Soumendra N. (2006), Measure theory and probability theory, Springer, ISBN 0-387-32903-X.
- Bartle, Robert G.; Sherbert, Donald R. (2011), Introduction to Real Analysis (4th ed.), New York: John Wiley & Sons, ISBN 978-0-471-43331-6.
- Folland, Gerald B. (1999), Real Analysis: Modern Techniques and Their Applications, Pure and Applied Mathematics (2nd ed.), New York: Wiley, ISBN 978-0-471-31716-6.
- Koblitz, Neal (1984), p-adic Numbers, p-adic Analysis, and Zeta-Functions, Graduate Texts in Mathematics, vol. 58 (2nd ed.), New York: Springer, doi:10.1007/978-1-4612-1112-9, ISBN 978-0-387-96017-3.
- Lee, John M. (2018), Introduction to Riemannian Manifolds, Graduate Texts in Mathematics, vol. 176 (2nd ed.), Cham: Springer, doi:10.1007/978-3-319-91755-9, ISBN 978-3-319-91755-9.
- Munkres, James R. (2000), Topology (2nd ed.), Upper Saddle River, New Jersey: Prentice Hall, ISBN 0-13-181629-2.
- Nielsen, Ole A. (1997), An introduction to integration and measure theory, Wiley-Interscience, ISBN 0-471-59518-7.
- Pugh, Charles Chapman (2015), Real Mathematical Analysis, Undergraduate Texts in Mathematics (2nd ed.), Cham: Springer, doi:10.1007/978-3-319-17771-7, ISBN 978-3-319-17770-0.
- Royden, H. L.; Fitzpatrick, Patrick M. (2010), Real Analysis (4th ed.), Boston: Pearson, ISBN 978-0-13-143747-0.

== Bibliography ==
- Abbott, Stephen (2001). Understanding Analysis. Undergraduate Texts in Mathematics. New York: Springer-Verlag. ISBN 0-387-95060-5.
- Aliprantis, Charalambos D.; Burkinshaw, Owen (1998). Principles of real analysis (3rd ed.). Academic. ISBN 0-12-050257-7.
- Bartle, Robert G.; Sherbert, Donald R. (2011). Introduction to Real Analysis (4th ed.). New York: John Wiley and Sons. ISBN 978-0-471-43331-6.
- Bressoud, David (2007). A Radical Approach to Real Analysis. MAA. ISBN 978-0-88385-747-2.
- Browder, Andrew (1996). Mathematical Analysis: An Introduction. Undergraduate Texts in Mathematics. New York: Springer-Verlag. ISBN 0-387-94614-4.
- Carothers, Neal L. (2000). Real Analysis. Cambridge: Cambridge University Press. ISBN 978-0521497565.
- Dangello, Frank; Seyfried, Michael (1999). Introductory Real Analysis. Brooks Cole. ISBN 978-0-395-95933-6.
- Kolmogorov, A. N.; Fomin, S. V. (1975). Introductory Real Analysis. Translated by Richard A. Silverman. Dover Publications. ISBN 0486612260.
- Rudin, Walter (1976). Principles of Mathematical Analysis. Walter Rudin Student Series in Advanced Mathematics (3rd ed.). New York: McGraw–Hill. ISBN 978-0-07-054235-8.
- Rudin, Walter (1987). Real and Complex Analysis (3rd ed.). New York: McGraw-Hill. ISBN 978-0-07-054234-1.
- Spivak, Michael (1994). Calculus (3rd ed.). Houston, Texas: Publish or Perish, Inc. ISBN 091409890X.
