= Unnikrishna Pillai =

Unnikrishna Pillai is a professor of electrical engineering at the New York University Tandon School of Engineering in Brooklyn, New York. He is a Fellow of the Institute of Electrical and Electronics Engineers (IEEE) since 2015 for his work in adaptive signal processing and radar systems.

Unnikrishna received his B.S. in Electronics Engineering from the Institute of Technology (Banaras Hindu University), India (1977), his Master's degree in Electrical Engineering from I.I.T. Kanpur, India (1982), and his PhD in Systems Engineering from the Moore School of Electrical Engineering at the University of Pennsylvania in 1985. He also worked as a Radar engineer at Bharat Electronics Limited in Bangalore, India from 1978 to July 1980.

In September 1985, Unnikrishna joined the department of Electrical Engineering at the Polytechnic Institute of New York in Brooklyn as an Assistant Professor. Since 1995, Unnikrishna has been a professor of electrical and computer engineering. He is the author/coauthor of five textbooks, four e-books on Probability, and over one hundred thirty technical publications. His present research activities include Radar Signal Processing, synthetic aperture radar (SAR) applications for moving target detection, spectrum estimation, and System Identification, Waveform Design, risk/reward strategies for long-term investment, automated path planning for self driving vehicles on the road and up in the air (drones and applications of nonlinear differential equations to engineering problems.
