= Fatou's lemma =

Lemma in measure theory

In mathematics, Fatou's lemma establishes an inequality relating the Lebesgue integral of the limit inferior of a sequence of functions to the limit inferior of integrals of these functions. The lemma is named after Pierre Fatou.

Fatou's lemma can be used to prove the Fatou–Lebesgue theorem and Lebesgue's dominated convergence theorem.

== Standard statement ==
In what follows, $\operatorname{\mathcal B}_{\bar\R_{\geq 0}}$ denotes the $\sigma$-algebra of Borel sets on $[0,+\infty]$.

Theorem—Fatou's lemma. Given a measure space $(\Omega,\mathcal{F},\mu)$ and a set $X \in \mathcal{F},$ let $\{f_n\}$ be a sequence of $(\mathcal{F}, \operatorname{\mathcal B}_{\bar\R_{\geq 0}})$-measurable non-negative functions $f_n: X\to [0,+\infty]$. Define the function $f: X\to [0,+\infty]$ by $f(x) =\liminf_{n\to\infty} f_n(x),$ for every $x\in X$. Then $f$ is $(\mathcal{F}, \operatorname{\mathcal B}_{\bar\R_{\geq 0}})$-measurable, and

$$\int_X f\,d\mu \le \liminf_{n\to\infty} \int_X f_n\,d\mu,$$

where the integrals and the limit inferior may be infinite.

Fatou's lemma remains true if its assumptions hold $\mu$-almost everywhere. In other words, it is enough that there is a null set $N$ such that the values $\{f_n(x)\}$ are non-negative for every ${x\in X\setminus N}.$ To see this, note that the integrals appearing in Fatou's lemma are unchanged if we change each function on $N$.

=== Proof ===
Fatou's lemma does not require the monotone convergence theorem, but the latter can be used to provide a quick and natural proof. A proof directly from the definitions of integrals is given further below.

==== Via the Monotone Convergence Theorem ====
let $\textstyle g_n(x)=\inf_{k\geq n}f_k(x)$. Then:

1. the sequence $\{g_n(x)\}_n$ is pointwise non-decreasing at any x and
2. $g_n\leq f_n$, $\forall n \in \N$.

Since

$$f(x) =\liminf_{n\to\infty} f_n(x) = \sup_n \inf_{k\geq n} f_k(x) = \sup_n g_n(x)$$,

and infima and suprema of measurable functions are measurable we see that $f$ is measurable.

By the Monotone Convergence Theorem and property (1), the sup and integral may be interchanged:

$$\begin{align}
\int_X f\,d\mu&= \int_X \sup_n g_n\,d\mu\\
&=\sup_n \int_X g_n\,d\mu\\
&=\liminf_{n\to \infty}\int_X g_n\,d\mu\\
&\leq \liminf_{n\to \infty}\int_X f_n\,d\mu,
\end{align}$$

where the last step used property (2).

==== From "first principles" ====
To demonstrate that the monotone convergence theorem is not "hidden", the proof below does not use any properties of Lebesgue integral except those established here and the fact that the functions $f$ and $g_n$ are measurable.

Denote by $\operatorname{SF}(f)$ the set of simple $(\mathcal{F}, \operatorname{\mathcal B}_{\R_{\geq 0}})$-measurable functions $s:X\to [0,\infty)$ such that $0\leq s\leq f$ on $X$.

Monotonicity—

- If $f \leq g$ everywhere on $X,$ then

$$\int_X f\,d\mu \leq \int_X g\,d\mu.$$

- If $X_1,X_2 \in \mathcal{F}$ and $X_1 \subseteq X_2,$ then

$$\int_{X_1} f\,d\mu \leq \int_{X_2} f\,d\mu.$$

- If f is nonnegative and $S= \cup^\infty_{i=1}S_i$, where $S_1\subseteq\ldots\subseteq S_i\subseteq\ldots\subseteq S$ is a non-decreasing chain of $\mu$-measurable sets, then

$$\int_S{f\,d\mu}=\lim_{n\to\infty}{\int_{S_n}{f\,d\mu}}$$

Proof

1. Since $f \leq g,$ we have

$$\operatorname{SF}(f) \subseteq \operatorname{SF}(g).$$

By definition of Lebesgue integral and the properties of supremum,

$$\int_X f\,d\mu = \sup_{s\in {\rm SF}(f)}\int_X s\,d\mu \leq \sup_{s\in {\rm SF}(g)}\int_X s\,d\mu = \int_X g\,d\mu.$$

2. Let ${\mathbf 1}_{X_1}$ be the indicator function of the set $X_1.$ It can be deduced from the definition of Lebesgue integral that

$$\int_{X_2} f\cdot {\mathbf 1}_{X_1} \,d\mu = \int_{X_1} f \,d\mu$$

if we notice that, for every $s \in {\rm SF}(f\cdot {\mathbf 1}_{X_1}),$ $s=0$ outside of $X_1.$ Combined with the previous property, the inequality $f\cdot {\mathbf 1}_{X_1} \leq f$ implies

$$\int_{X_1} f \,d\mu = \int_{X_2} f\cdot {\mathbf 1}_{X_1} \,d\mu \leq \int_{X_2} f \,d\mu.$$

3. First note that the claim holds if f is the indicator function of a set, by monotonicity of measures. By linearity, this also immediately implies the claim for simple functions.

Since any simple function supported on S_{n} is simple and supported on X, we must have

$$\int_X{f\,d\mu}\geq\lim_{n\to\infty}{\int_{S_n}{f\,d\mu}}$$.

For the reverse, suppose g ∈ SF(f) with $\textstyle \int_X{f\,d\mu}-\epsilon\leq\int_X{g\,d\mu}$ By the above,

$$\int_X{f\,d\mu}-\epsilon\leq\int_X{g\,d\mu}=\lim_{n\to\infty}{\int_{S_n}{g\,d\mu}}\leq\lim_{n\to\infty}{\int_{S_n}{f\,d\mu}}$$

Now we turn to the main theorem

Step 1—$g_n=g_n(x)$ is $(\mathcal{F}, \operatorname{\mathcal B}_{\R_{\geq 0}})$-measurable, for every $n\geq 1$, as is $f$.

Proof

Recall the closed intervals generate the Borel σ-algebra. Thus it suffices to show, for every $t\in [-\infty,+\infty]$, that $g^{-1}_n([t,+\infty])\in\mathcal{F}$. Now observe that

$$\begin{align}
g^{-1}_n([t,+\infty])&=\left\{x\in X\mid g_n(x)\geq t\right\}\\[3pt]
&=\left\{x\in X \; \left| \; \inf_{k \, \geq \, n} f_k(x) \geq t \right. \right\}\\[3pt]
&=\bigcap_{k \, \geq \, n}\left\{x\in X\mid f_k(x)\geq t\right\}\\[3pt]
&=\bigcap_{k \, \geq \, n} f^{-1}_k([t,+\infty])
\end{align}$$

Every set on the right-hand side is from $\mathcal{F}$, which is closed under countable intersections. Thus the left-hand side is also a member of $\mathcal{F}$.

Similarly, it is enough to verify that $f^{-1}([0,t])\in\mathcal{F}$, for every $t\in [-\infty,+\infty]$. Since the sequence $\{g_n(x)\}$ pointwise non-decreases,

$$f^{-1}([0,t])=\bigcap_{n}g^{-1}_n([0,t])\in\mathcal{F}$$.

Step 2—Given a simple function $s\in\operatorname{SF}(f)$ and a real number $t\in (0,1)$, define

$$B^{s,t}_k=\{x\in X\mid t\cdot s(x)\leq g_k(x)\}\subseteq X.$$

Then $B^{s,t}_k\in\mathcal{F}$, $B^{s,t}_k\subseteq B^{s,t}_{k+1}$, and $\textstyle X=\bigcup_k B^{s,t}_k$.

Proof

Step 2a. To prove the first claim, write s as a weighted sum of indicator functions of disjoint sets:

$$s=\sum^m_{i=1}c_i\cdot\mathbf{1}_{A_i}$$.

Then

$$B^{s,t}_k=\bigcup^m_{i=1}\Bigl(g^{-1}_k\Bigl([t\cdot c_i,+\infty]\Bigr)\cap A_i\Bigr)$$.

Since the pre-image $g^{-1}_k\Bigl([t\cdot c_i,+\infty]\Bigr)$ of the Borel set $[t\cdot c_i,+\infty]$ under the measurable function $g_k$ is measurable, and $\sigma$-algebras are closed under finite intersection and unions, the first claim follows.

Step 2b. To prove the second claim, note that, for each $k$ and every $x\in X$, $g_k(x) \leq g_{k+1}(x).$

Step 2c. To prove the third claim, suppose for contradiction there exists

$$x_0\in X\setminus\bigcup_k B^{s,t}_k=\bigcap_k(X\setminus B^{s,t}_k)$$

Then $0\leq g_k(x_0)<t\cdot s(x_0)<s(x_0)$, for every $k$. Taking the limit as $k\to\infty$,

$$f(x_0)\leq t\cdot s(x_0)<s(x_0).$$

This contradicts our initial assumption that $s\leq f$.

Step 3—From step 2 and monotonicity,

$$\lim_n\int_{B^{s,t}_n}s\,d\mu=\int_Xs\,d\mu.$$

Step 4—For every $s\in\operatorname{SF}(f)$,

$$\int_X s\,d\mu\leq \lim_k\int_X g_k\,d\mu$$.

Proof

Indeed, using the definition of $B^{s,t}_k$, the non-negativity of $g_k$, and the monotonicity of Lebesgue integral, we have

$$\forall k \geq 1 \qquad \int_{B^{s,t}_k}t\cdot s\,d\mu\leq \int_{B^{s,t}_k} g_k\,d\mu\leq \int_X g_k\,d\mu$$.

In accordance with Step 4, as $k\to\infty$ the inequality becomes

$$t\int_X s\,d\mu\leq\lim_k\int_X g_k\,d\mu$$.

Taking the limit as $t\uparrow 1$ yields

$$\int_X s\,d\mu\leq\lim_k\int_X g_k\,d\mu$$,

as required.

Step 5—To complete the proof, we apply the definition of Lebesgue integral to the inequality established in Step 4 and take into account that $g_n\leq f_n$:

$$\begin{align}
\int_X f \,d\mu&=\sup_{s\in\operatorname{SF}(f)}\int_X s\,d\mu\\
&\leq\lim_k\int_X g_k\,d\mu\\
&=\liminf_k\int_X g_k\,d\mu\\
&\leq\liminf_k\int_X f_k\,d\mu
\end{align}$$

The proof is complete.

== Examples for strict inequality ==
Equip the space $S$ with the Borel σ-algebra and the Lebesgue measure.

- Example for a probability space: Let $S=[0,1]$ denote the unit interval. For every natural number $n$ define

$$f_n(x)=\begin{cases}n&\text{for }x\in (0,1/n),\\
0&\text{otherwise.}
\end{cases}$$

- Example with uniform convergence: Let $S$ denote the set of all real numbers. Define

$$f_n(x)=\begin{cases}\frac1n&\text{for }x\in [0,n],\\
0&\text{otherwise.}
\end{cases}$$

These sequences $(f_n)_{n\in\N}$ converge on $S$ pointwise (respectively uniformly) to the zero function (with zero integral), but every $f_n$ has integral one.

== The role of non-negativity ==
A suitable assumption concerning the negative parts of the sequence f_{1}, f_{2}, . . . of functions is necessary for Fatou's lemma, as the following example shows. Let S denote the half line [0,∞) with the Borel σ-algebra and the Lebesgue measure. For every natural number n define

$$f_n(x)=\begin{cases}-\frac1n&\text{for }x\in [n,2n],\\
0&\text{otherwise.}
\end{cases}$$

This sequence converges uniformly on S to the zero function and the limit, 0, is reached in a finite number of steps: for every x ≥ 0, if n > x, then f_{n}(x) = 0. However, every function f_{n} has integral −1. Contrary to Fatou's lemma, this value is strictly less than the integral of the limit (0).

As discussed in § Extensions and variations of Fatou's lemma below, the problem is that there is no uniform integrable bound on the sequence from below, while 0 is the uniform bound from above.

== Reverse Fatou lemma ==
Let f_{1}, f_{2}, . . . be a sequence of extended real-valued measurable functions defined on a measure space (S,Σ,μ). If there exists a non-negative integrable function g on S such that f_{n} ≤ g for all n, then

$$\limsup_{n\to\infty}\int_S f_n\,d\mu\leq\int_S\limsup_{n\to\infty}f_n\,d\mu.$$

Note: Here g integrable means that g is measurable and that $\textstyle\int_S g\,d\mu<\infty$.

=== Sketch of proof ===
We apply linearity of Lebesgue integral and Fatou's lemma to the sequence $g - f_n.$ Since $\textstyle\int_Sg\,d\mu < +\infty,$ this sequence is defined $\mu$-almost everywhere and non-negative.

== Extensions and variations of Fatou's lemma ==
=== Integrable lower bound ===
Let $f_1, f_2, \ldots$ be a sequence of extended real-valued measurable functions defined on a measure space $(S, \Sigma, \mu)$. If there exists an integrable function $g$ on $S$ such that $f_n \ge -g$ for all $n$, then

$$\int_S \liminf_{n\to\infty} f_n\,d\mu
\le \liminf_{n\to\infty} \int_S f_n\,d\mu.$$

==== Proof ====
Apply Fatou's lemma to the non-negative sequence given by $f_n + g$.

=== Pointwise convergence ===
If in the previous setting the sequence $f_1, f_2, \ldots$ converges pointwise to a function $f$ $\mu$-almost everywhere on $S$, then

$$\int_S f\,d\mu \le \liminf_{n\to\infty} \int_S f_n\,d\mu\,.$$

==== Proof ====
Note that $f$ has to agree with the limit inferior of the functions $f_n$ almost everywhere, and that the values of the integrand on a set of measure zero have no influence on the value of the integral.

=== Convergence in measure ===
The last assertion also holds, if the sequence $f_1, f_2, \ldots$ converges in measure to a function $f$.

==== Proof ====
There exists a subsequence such that

$$\lim_{k\to\infty} \int_S f_{n_k}\,d\mu=\liminf_{n\to\infty} \int_S f_n\,d\mu.$$

Since this subsequence also converges in measure to $f$, there exists a further subsequence, which converges pointwise to $f$ almost everywhere, hence the previous variation of Fatou's lemma is applicable to this subsubsequence.

=== Fatou's Lemma with Converging Measures ===
Measures with setwise convergence

In all of the above statements of Fatou's Lemma, the integration was carried out with respect to a single fixed measure $\mu$. Suppose that $\mu_n$ is a sequence of measures on the measurable space $(M, \Sigma)$ such that (see Convergence of measures)

$$\forall E\in \mathcal{F} \colon\; \mu_n(E)\to \mu(E)$$.

Then, with $f_n$ non-negative integrable functions and $f$ being their pointwise limit inferior, we have

$$\int_S f\,d\mu \leq \liminf_{n\to \infty} \int_S f_n\, d\mu_n.$$

Proof
We will prove something a bit stronger here. Namely, we will allow $f_n$ to converge $\mu$-almost everywhere on a subset $E$ of $S$. We seek to show that

$$\int_E f\,d\mu \le \liminf_{n\to\infty} \int_E f_n\,d\mu_n\,.$$

Let

$$K=\{x\in E|f_n(x)\rightarrow f(x)\}$$.

Then μ(E-K)=0 and

$$\int_{E}f\,d\mu=\int_{E-K}f\,d\mu,~~~\int_{E}f_n\,d\mu=\int_{E-K}f_n\,d\mu ~\forall n\in \N.$$

Thus, replacing $E$ by $E-K$ we may assume that $f_n$ converge to $f$ pointwise on $E$. Next, note that for any simple function $\phi$ we have

$$\int_{E}\phi\, d\mu=\lim_{n\to \infty} \int_{E} \phi\, d\mu_n.$$

Hence, by the definition of the Lebesgue Integral, it is enough to show that if $\phi$ is any non-negative simple function less than or equal to $f$, then

$$\int_{E}\phi \,d\mu\leq \liminf_{n\rightarrow \infty} \int_{E}f_n\,d\mu_n$$

Let a be the minimum non-negative value of φ. Define

$$A=\{x\in E |\phi(x)>a\}$$

We first consider the case when $\int_{E}\phi\, d\mu=\infty$. We must have that $\mu(A)$ is infinite since

$$\int_{E}\phi\, d\mu \leq M\mu(A),$$

where M is the (necessarily finite) maximum value of that $\phi$ attains. Next, we define

$$A_n=\{x\in E |f_k(x)>a~\forall k\geq n \}.$$

We have that

$$A\subseteq \bigcup_n A_n \Rightarrow \mu(\bigcup_n A_n)=\infty.$$

But $A_n$ is a nested increasing sequence of functions and hence, by the continuity from below $\mu$,

$$\lim_{n\rightarrow \infty} \mu(A_n)=\infty.$$.

Thus,

$$\lim_{n\to\infty}\mu_n(A_n)=\mu(A_n)=\infty.$$.

At the same time,

$$\int_E f_n\, d\mu_n \geq a \mu_n(A_n) \Rightarrow \liminf_{n\to \infty}\int_E f_n \, d\mu_n = \infty = \int_E \phi\, d\mu,$$

proving the claim in this case. The remaining case is when $\int_{E}\phi\, d\mu<\infty$. We must have that $\mu(A)$ is finite. Denote, as above, by $M$ the maximum value of $\phi$ and fix $\epsilon > 0$ Define

$$A_n=\{x\in E|f_k(x)>(1-\epsilon)\phi(x)~\forall k\geq n\}.$$

Then A_{n} is a nested increasing sequence of sets whose union contains $A$. Thus, $A-A_n$ is a decreasing sequence of sets with empty intersection. Since $A$ has finite measure (this is why we needed to consider the two separate cases),

$$\lim_{n\rightarrow \infty} \mu(A-A_n)=0.$$

Thus, there exists n such that

$$\mu(A-A_k)<\epsilon ,~\forall k\geq n.$$

Therefore, since

$$\lim_{n\to \infty} \mu_n(A-A_k)=\mu(A-A_k),$$

there exists N such that

$$\mu_k(A-A_k)<\epsilon,~\forall k\geq N.$$

Hence, for $k\geq N$

$$\int_E f_k \, d\mu_k \geq \int_{A_k}f_k \, d\mu_k \geq (1-\epsilon)\int_{A_k}\phi\, d\mu_k.$$

At the same time,

$$\int_E \phi \, d\mu_k = \int_A \phi \, d\mu_k = \int_{A_k} \phi \, d\mu_k + \int_{A-A_k} \phi \, d\mu_k.$$

Hence,

$$(1-\epsilon)\int_{A_k} \phi \, d\mu_k \geq (1-\epsilon)\int_E \phi \, d\mu_k -  \int_{A-A_k} \phi \, d\mu_k.$$

Combining these inequalities gives that

$$\int_{E} f_k \, d\mu_k \geq (1-\epsilon)\int_E \phi \, d\mu_k -  \int_{A-A_k} \phi \, d\mu_k \geq \int_E \phi \, d\mu_k -  \epsilon\left(\int_{E} \phi \, d\mu_k+M\right).$$

Hence, sending $\epsilon$ to 0 and taking the liminf in $n$, we get that

$$\liminf_{n\rightarrow \infty} \int_{E} f_n \, d\mu_k \geq \int_E \phi \, d\mu,$$

completing the proof.

Asymptotically uniform integrable functions

The following results use the notion asymptotically uniform integrable (a.u.i). A sequence $\{f_n\}_{n\in\natnums}$ of measurable $\{\R \cup \pm \infty\}$-valued functions is a.u.i with respect to a sequence of measures $\{\mu_n\}_{n\in\natnums}$ if

$\lim_{K\rightarrow +\infty} \limsup_{n\rightarrow\infty} \int_M |f_n(s)| \mathbf{I}\{s\in M:|f_n(s)|\ge K\}\mu_n(ds)=0\,.$

Weakly converging measures

A sequence of measures $\{\mu_n\}_{n\in\natnums}$ on a metric space $M$ converges weakly to a finite measure $\mu$ on M if, for each bounded continuous function $f$ on $M$,

$\int_{M} f(s) \mu_n(ds) \rightarrow \int_{M} f(s)\mu(ds) \quad \text{as } n \rightarrow \infty\,.$

Theorem—Denote $f_n^-(s)=-\min\{ f_n(s),0 \}$. Let $M$ be a metric space, $\{\mu_n\}_{n\in\natnums}$ be a sequence of measures on $M$ converging weakly to $\mu\in\mathcal{M}(M)$, and $\{f_n\}_{n\in\natnums}$ be a sequence of measurable $\{\R \cup \pm \infty\}$-valued functions on $M$ such that $\{f_n^-\}_{n\in\natnums}$ is a.u.i with respect to $\{\mu_n\}_{n\in\natnums}$. Then

$$\int_M \liminf_{n\rightarrow\infty,s'\rightarrow s} f_n(s') \mu(ds) \le \liminf_{n \rightarrow \infty} \int_M f_n(s) \mu_n(ds)\,.$$

Measures with convergence in total variation

A sequence of finite measures $\{\mu_n\}_{n\in\natnums}$ on a measurable space $(M,\Sigma)$ converges in total variation to a measure $\mu$ on $(M,\Sigma)$ if

$\sup \left\{ \left| \int_M f(s) \mu_n(ds) -\int_M f(s)\mu(ds)\right|:\, f:M\mapsto[-1,1] \text{ is measurable} \right\} \rightarrow 0 \quad \text{as } n\rightarrow \infty\,.$

Theorem—Let $M$ be a measurable space, $\{\mu_n\}_{n\in\natnums}$ be a sequence of measures on $M$ converging in total variation to a measure $\mu\in\mathcal{M}(M)$, and $\{f_n\}_{n\in\natnums}$ be a sequence of measurable $\{\R \cup \pm \infty\}$-valued functions on $M$, and $f$ be a measurable $\{\R \cup \pm \infty\}$-valued function. Assume that $f\in L^1(M;\mu)$ and $f_n\in L^1(M;\mu_n)$ Then

$$\liminf_{n\rightarrow\infty} \inf_{C\in\Sigma}\left(
\int_C f_n(s) \mu_n(ds) - \int_C f(s) \mu(ds)
\right) \ge 0 \,,$$

if and only if the following two statements hold:

(i) for each $\varepsilon > 0$, $\mu(\{s \in M : f_n(s) \leq f(s) - \varepsilon \}) \to 0$ as $n \to \infty$, and, therefore, there exists a subsequence $\{f_{n_k}\}_{k \in \natnums} \subset \{f_n\}_{n \in \natnums}$ such that $f(s) \leq \liminf_{k \to \infty} f_{n_k}(s)$ for $\mu$-a.e. $s \in M$;
(ii) $\{f^-_n\}_{n \in \natnums}$ is a.u.i. with respect to $\{\mu_n\}_{n \in \natnums}$.

== Fatou's lemma for conditional expectations ==
In probability theory, by a change of notation, the above versions of Fatou's lemma are applicable to sequences of random variables X_{1}, X_{2}, . . . defined on a probability space $\scriptstyle(\Omega,\,\mathcal F,\,\mathbb P)$; the integrals turn into expectations. In addition, there is also a version for conditional expectations.

=== Standard version ===
Let X_{1}, X_{2}, . . . be a sequence of non-negative random variables on a probability space $\scriptstyle(\Omega,\mathcal F,\mathbb P)$ and let $\scriptstyle \mathcal G\,\subset\,\mathcal F$ be a sub-σ-algebra. Then

$\mathbb{E}\Bigl[\liminf_{n\to\infty}X_n\,\Big|\,\mathcal G\Bigr]\le\liminf_{n\to\infty}\,\mathbb{E}[X_n|\mathcal G]$ almost surely.

Note: Conditional expectation for non-negative random variables is always well defined, finite expectation is not needed.

==== Proof ====
Besides a change of notation, the proof is very similar to the one for the standard version of Fatou's lemma above, however the monotone convergence theorem for conditional expectations has to be applied.

Let X denote the limit inferior of the X_{n}. For every natural number k define pointwise the random variable

$$Y_k=\inf_{n\ge k}X_n.$$

Then the sequence Y_{1}, Y_{2}, . . . is increasing and converges pointwise to X. For k ≤ n, we have Y_{k} ≤ X_{n}, so that

$\mathbb{E}[Y_k|\mathcal G]\le\mathbb{E}[X_n|\mathcal G]$ almost surely

by the monotonicity of conditional expectation, hence

$\mathbb{E}[Y_k|\mathcal G]\le\inf_{n\ge k}\mathbb{E}[X_n|\mathcal G]$ almost surely,

because the countable union of the exceptional sets of probability zero is again a null set. Using the definition of X, its representation as pointwise limit of the Y_{k}, the monotone convergence theorem for conditional expectations, the last inequality, and the definition of the limit inferior, it follows that almost surely

$$\begin{align}
\mathbb{E}\Bigl[\liminf_{n\to\infty}X_n\,\Big|\,\mathcal G\Bigr]
&=\mathbb{E}[X|\mathcal G]
=\mathbb{E}\Bigl[\lim_{k\to\infty}Y_k\,\Big|\,\mathcal G\Bigr]
=\lim_{k\to\infty}\mathbb{E}[Y_k|\mathcal G]\\
&\le\lim_{k\to\infty} \inf_{n\ge k}\mathbb{E}[X_n|\mathcal G]
=\liminf_{n\to\infty}\,\mathbb{E}[X_n|\mathcal G].
\end{align}$$

=== Extension to uniformly integrable negative parts ===
Let X_{1}, X_{2}, . . . be a sequence of random variables on a probability space $\scriptstyle(\Omega,\mathcal F,\mathbb P)$ and let $\scriptstyle \mathcal G\,\subset\,\mathcal F$ be a sub-σ-algebra. If the negative parts

$$X_n^-:=\max\{-X_n,0\},\qquad n\in{\mathbb N},$$

are uniformly integrable with respect to the conditional expectation, in the sense that, for ε > 0 there exists a c > 0 such that

$$\mathbb{E}\bigl[X_n^-1_{\{X_n^->c\}}\,|\,\mathcal G\bigr]<\varepsilon,
\qquad\text{for all }n\in\mathbb{N},\,\text{almost surely}$$,

then

$\mathbb{E}\Bigl[\liminf_{n\to\infty}X_n\,\Big|\,\mathcal G\Bigr]\le\liminf_{n\to\infty}\,\mathbb{E}[X_n|\mathcal G]$ almost surely.

Note: On the set where

$$X:=\liminf_{n\to\infty}X_n$$

satisfies

$$\mathbb{E}[\max\{X,0\}\,|\,\mathcal G]=\infty,$$

the left-hand side of the inequality is considered to be plus infinity. The conditional expectation of the limit inferior might not be well defined on this set, because the conditional expectation of the negative part might also be plus infinity.

==== Proof ====
Let ε > 0. Due to uniform integrability with respect to the conditional expectation, there exists a c > 0 such that

$$\mathbb{E}\bigl[X_n^-1_{\{X_n^->c\}}\,|\,\mathcal G\bigr]<\varepsilon
\qquad\text{for all }n\in\mathbb{N},\,\text{almost surely}.$$

Since

$$X+c\le\liminf_{n\to\infty}(X_n+c)^+,$$

where x^{+} := max{x,0} denotes the positive part of a real x, monotonicity of conditional expectation (or the above convention) and the standard version of Fatou's lemma for conditional expectations imply

$\mathbb{E}[X\,|\,\mathcal G]+c \le\mathbb{E}\Bigl[\liminf_{n\to\infty}(X_n+c)^+\,\Big|\,\mathcal G\Bigr] \le\liminf_{n\to\infty}\mathbb{E}[(X_n+c)^+\,|\,\mathcal G]$ almost surely.

Since

$$(X_n+c)^+=(X_n+c)+(X_n+c)^-\le X_n+c+X_n^-1_{\{X_n^->c\}},$$

we have

$\mathbb{E}[(X_n+c)^+\,|\,\mathcal G] \le\mathbb{E}[X_n\,|\,\mathcal G]+c+\varepsilon$ almost surely,

hence

$\mathbb{E}[X\,|\,\mathcal G]\le \liminf_{n\to\infty}\mathbb{E}[X_n\,|\,\mathcal G]+\varepsilon$ almost surely.

This implies the assertion.
