= Sheldon M. Ross =

American mathematician (born 1943)

Sheldon Mark Ross (born April 30, 1943) is the Daniel J. Epstein Chair and Professor at the USC Viterbi School of Engineering. He is the author of several books in the field of probability.

== Biography ==
Ross was born in Brooklyn. He received his B. S. degree in mathematics from Brooklyn College in 1963, his M.S. degrees in mathematics from Purdue University in 1964 and his Ph.D. degree in Statistics from Stanford University in 1968, studying under Gerald Lieberman and Cyrus Derman. He served as a Professor at the University of California, Berkeley from 1976 until joining the USC Viterbi School of Engineering in 2004. He serves as the Editor for several journals, among which Probability in the Engineering and Informational Sciences. In 2013 he became a fellow of the Institute for Operations Research and the Management Sciences.

In 1978, he formulated what became known as Ross's conjecture in queuing theory, which was solved three years later by Tomasz Rolski at Poland's Wroclaw University.

== Books ==
- Ross, S. M. (1970), Applied Probability Models with Optimization Applications. Holden-Day: San Francisco, CA.
- Ross, S. M. (1972), Introduction to Probability Models. Academic Press: Waltham, Mass.
- Ross, S. M. (1976), A First Course in Probability. MacMillan Publishing Company: London.
- Ross, S. M. (1982), Stochastic Processes. John Wiley & Sons: New York.
- Ross, S. M. (1983), Introduction to Stochastic Dynamic Programming. Academic Press: Waltham, Mass.
- Ross, Sheldon M. (1990). A course in simulation. New York : London: Macmillan; Collier Macmillan. ISBN 978-0-02-403891-3.
- Ross, S. M. (1995), Introductory Statistics. Academic Press: Waltham, Mass.
- Ross, S. M. (1996), Simulation. Academic Press: Waltham, Mass.
- Derman, Cyrus; Ross, Sheldon M. (1997). Statistical aspects of quality control. Statistical modeling and decision science. San Diego: Academic Press. ISBN 978-0-12-210010-9.
- Ross, Sheldon M. (1999). An introduction to mathematical finance: options and other topics. Cambridge, U.K.; New York: Cambridge University Press. ISBN 978-0-521-77043-9.
- Ross, Sheldon M. (2000). Topics in finite and discrete mathematics. Cambridge; New York: Cambridge University Press. ISBN 978-0-521-77259-4.
- Ross, Sheldon M. (2001). Probability models for computer science. San Diego, Calif.: Academic Press. ISBN 978-0-12-598051-7.
- Ross, Sheldon M. (2009). Introduction to probability and statistics for engineers and scientists (4th ed.). Amsterdam; Boston: Academic Press/Elsevier. ISBN 978-0-12-370483-2.
- Ross, Sheldon M.; Peköz, Erol A. (2023). A second course in probability (2nd ed.). Cambridge, United Kingdom; New York, NY: Cambridge University Press. ISBN 978-1-009-17991-1.
