= Monotone convergence theorem =

Theorems on the convergence of bounded monotonic sequences

In real analysis, the monotone convergence theorem is any of a number of related theorems proving, under certain conditions, the convergence of monotonic sequences, i.e. sequences that are non-increasing, or non-decreasing. In its simplest form, it says that a non-decreasing bounded-above sequence of real numbers $a_1 \le a_2 \le a_3 \le ...\le K$ converges to its smallest upper bound, its supremum. Likewise, a non-increasing bounded-below sequence converges to its largest lower bound, its infimum. In particular, infinite sums of non-negative numbers converge to the supremum of the partial sums if and only if the partial sums are bounded.

For non-negative double-indexed non-decreasing sequences $0 \le a_{i,1} \le a_{i,2} \le \cdots$, it says that taking the sum and the supremum can be interchanged.

In more advanced mathematics the monotone convergence theorem usually refers to a fundamental result in measure theory due to Lebesgue and Beppo Levi that says that for sequences of non-negative pointwise-increasing measurable functions $0 \le f_1(x) \le f_2(x) \le \cdots$, taking the integral and the supremum can be interchanged with the result being finite if either one is finite.

== Convergence of a monotone sequence of real numbers ==
Theorem: Let $(a_n)_{n\in\mathbb{N}}$ be a monotone sequence of real numbers (either $a_n\le a_{n+1}$ for all $n$ or $a_n\ge a_{n+1}$ for all $n$). Then the following are equivalent:

1. $(a_n)$ has a finite limit in $\mathbb{R}$.
2. $(a_n)$ is bounded.

Moreover, if $(a_n)$ is nondecreasing, then $\lim_{n\to\infty} a_n=\sup_n a_n$; if $(a_n)$ is nonincreasing, then $\lim_{n\to\infty} a_n=\inf_n a_n$.

=== Proof ===
(1 ⇒ 2) Suppose $(a_n)\to L\in\mathbb{R}$. By the $\varepsilon$-definition of limit, there exists $N$ such that $|a_n-L|<1$ for all $n\ge N$, hence $|a_n|\le |L|+1$ for $n\ge N$. Let $M=\max\{\,|a_1|,\dots,|a_{N-1}|,\,|L|+1\,\}$. Then $|a_n|\le M$ for all $n$, so $(a_n)$ is bounded.

(2 ⇒ 1) Suppose $(a_n)$ is bounded and monotone.

- If $(a_n)$ is nondecreasing and bounded above, set $c=\sup_n a_n$. For any $\varepsilon>0$, there exists $N$ with $c-\varepsilon<a_N\le c$; otherwise $c-\varepsilon$ would be a smaller upper bound than $c$. For $n\ge N$, monotonicity gives $a_N\le a_n\le c$, hence $0\le c-a_n\le c-a_N<\varepsilon$. Thus $a_n\to c=\sup_n a_n$.
- If $(a_n)$ is nonincreasing and bounded below, either repeat the argument with $c=\inf_n a_n$, or apply the previous case to $(-a_n)$ to obtain $a_n\to \inf_n a_n$.

This proves the equivalence.

=== Remark ===
The implication "bounded and monotone ⇒ convergent" may fail over $\mathbb{Q}$ because the supremum/infimum of a rational sequence need not be rational. For example, $a_n=\lfloor 10^n\sqrt{2}\rfloor/10^n$ is nondecreasing and bounded above by $\sqrt{2}$, but has no limit in $\mathbb{Q}$ (its real limit is $\sqrt{2}$).

== Convergence of a monotone series ==
There is a variant of the proposition above where we allow unbounded sequences in the extended real numbers, the real numbers with $\infty$ and $-\infty$ added.

$$\bar\R = \R \cup \{-\infty, \infty\}$$

In the extended real numbers every set has a supremum (resp. infimum) which of course may be $\infty$ (resp. $-\infty$) if the set is unbounded. An important use of the extended reals is that any set of non-negative numbers $a_i \ge 0, i \in I$ has a well defined summation order independent sum

$$\sum_{i \in I} a_i = \sup_{J \subset I,\ |J|< \infty} \sum_{j \in J} a_j \in \bar \R_{\ge 0}$$

where $\bar\R_{\ge 0} = [0, \infty] \subset \bar \R$ are the upper extended non-negative real numbers. For a series of non-negative numbers

$$\sum_{i = 1}^\infty a_i = \lim_{k \to \infty} \sum_{i = 1}^k a_i = \sup_k \sum_{i =1}^k a_i = \sup_{J \subset \N, |J| < \infty} \sum_{j \in J} a_j = \sum_{i \in \N} a_i,$$

so this sum coincides with the sum of a series if both are defined. In particular the sum of a series of non-negative numbers does not depend on the order of summation.

== Monotone convergence of non-negative sums ==
Let $a_{i,k} \ge 0$ be a sequence of non-negative real numbers indexed by natural numbers $i$ and $k$. Suppose that $a_{i,k} \le a_{i,k+1}$ for all $i, k$. Then

$$\sup_k \sum_i a_{i,k} = \sum_i \sup_k a_{i,k} \in \bar\R_{\ge 0}.$$

=== Proof ===
Since $a_{i,k} \le \sup_k a_{i,k}$ we have $\sum_i a_{i,k} \le \sum_i \sup_k a_{i,k}$ so $\sup_k \sum_i a_{i,k} \le \sum_i \sup_k a_{i,k}$.

Conversely, we can interchange sup and sum for finite sums by reverting to the limit definition, so $\sum_{i = 1}^N \sup_k a_{i,k} = \sup_k \sum_{i =1}^N a_{i,k} \le \sup_k \sum_{i =1}^\infty a_{i,k}$ hence $\sum_{i = 1}^\infty \sup_k a_{i,k} \le \sup_k \sum_{i =1}^\infty a_{i,k}$.

=== Examples ===
==== Matrices ====
The theorem states that if you have an infinite matrix of non-negative real numbers $a_{i,k} \ge 0$ such that the rows are weakly increasing and each is bounded $a_{i,k} \le K_i$ where the bounds are summable $\sum_i K_i <\infty$ then, for each column, the non-decreasing column sums $\sum_i a_{i,k} \le \sum K_i$ are bounded hence convergent, and the limit of the column sums is equal to the sum of the "limit column" $\sup_k a_{i,k}$ which element wise is the supremum over the row.

==== e ====
Consider the expansion

$$\left( 1+ \frac1k\right)^k = \sum_{i=0}^k \binom ki \frac1{k^i}$$

Now set

$$a_{i,k} = \binom ki \frac1{k^i} = \frac1{i!} \cdot \frac kk \cdot \frac{k-1}k\cdot \cdots \frac{k-i+1}k$$

for $i \le k$ and $a_{i,k} = 0$ for $i > k$, then $0\le a_{i,k} \le a_{i,k+1}$ with $\sup_k a_{i,k} = \frac 1{i!}<\infty$ and

$$\left( 1+ \frac1k\right)^k  = \sum_{i =0}^\infty a_{i,k}$$.

The right hand side is a non-decreasing sequence in $k$, therefore

$$\lim_{k \to \infty}
\left( 1+ \frac1k\right)^k = \sup_k \sum_{i=0}^\infty a_{i,k} = \sum_{i = 0}^\infty \sup_k  a_{i,k} = \sum_{i = 0}^\infty \frac1{i!} = e$$.

== Monotone convergence for non-negative measurable functions (Beppo Levi) ==
The following result extends the monotone convergence of non-negative series to the measure-theoretic setting. It is a cornerstone of measure and integration theory; Fatou's lemma and the dominated convergence theorem follow as direct consequences. It is due to Beppo Levi, who in 1906 proved a slight generalization of an earlier result by Henri Lebesgue.

Let $\operatorname{\mathcal B}_{\bar\R_{\ge 0}}$ denote the Borel $\sigma$-algebra on the extended half-line $[0,+\infty]$ (so $\{+\infty\}\in \operatorname{\mathcal B}_{\bar\R_{\ge 0}}$).

=== Theorem (Monotone convergence for non-negative measurable functions) ===
Let $(\Omega,\Sigma,\mu)$ be a measure space and $X\in\Sigma$. If $\{f_k\}_{k\ge 1}$ is a sequence of non-negative $(\Sigma,\operatorname{\mathcal B}_{\bar\R_{\ge 0}})$-measurable functions on $X$ such that $0\le f_1(x)\le f_2(x)\le\cdots \quad \text{for all }x\in X,$ then the pointwise supremum $f:=\sup_k f_k$ is measurable and $\int_X f\,d\mu \;=\; \lim_{k\to\infty}\int_X f_k\,d\mu \;=\; \sup_{k}\int_X f_k\,d\mu.$

=== Proof ===
Let $f=\sup_k f_k$. Measurability of $f$ follows since pointwise limits/suprema of measurable functions are measurable.

Upper bound. By monotonicity of the integral, $f_k\le f$ implies $\limsup_{k}\int_X f_k\,d\mu \;\le\; \int_X f\,d\mu.$

Lower bound. Fix a non-negative simple function $s \leq f$. Set $A_k=\{x\in X:\; as(x)\le f_k(x)\}$, with $a < 1$. Then $A_k\uparrow X$ because $f_k\uparrow f\ge s$. For the set function $\nu_s(A):=\int_A s\,d\mu,$ we have $\nu_s$ is a measure (write $s=\sum_i c_i \mathbf 1_{E_i}$ and note $\nu_s(A)=\sum_i c_i\,\mu(A\cap E_i)$), hence by continuity from below, $\int_X s\,d\mu \;=\; \lim_{k\to\infty}\int_{A_k} s\,d\mu.$ On each $A_k$ we have $as\le f_k$, so $a\int_{A_k}s\,d\mu \;\le\; \int_X f_k\,d\mu.$ Taking the limits for $k \to \infty$ and $a \to 1$ gives $\int_X s\,d\mu \le \liminf_k \int_X f_k\,d\mu$. Finally, take the supremum over all simple $s \leq f$ (which equals $\int_X f\,d\mu$ by definition of the Lebesgue integral) to obtain $\int_X f\,d\mu \;\le\; \liminf_k \int_X f_k\,d\mu.$

Combining the two bounds yields $\int_X f\,d\mu \;=\; \lim_{k\to\infty}\int_X f_k\,d\mu \;=\; \sup_k \int_X f_k\,d\mu. \square$

=== Remarks ===
1. (Finiteness.) The quantities may be finite or infinite; the left-hand side is finite iff the right-hand side is.
2. (Pointwise and integral limits.) Under the hypotheses,
  - $\displaystyle \lim_{k\to\infty} f_k(x)=\sup_k f_k(x)=\limsup_{k\to\infty} f_k(x)=\liminf_{k\to\infty} f_k(x)$ for all $x$;
  - by monotonicity of the integral, $\displaystyle \lim_{k\to\infty}\int_X f_k\,d\mu=\sup_k\int_X f_k\,d\mu=\liminf_{k\to\infty}\int_X f_k\,d\mu=\limsup_{k\to\infty}\int_X f_k\,d\mu.$ Equivalently, $\displaystyle \lim_{k\to\infty}\int_X f_k\,d\mu=\int_X \lim_{k\to\infty} f_k\,d\mu,$ with the understanding that the limits may be $+\infty$.
3. (Almost-everywhere version.) If the monotonicity holds $\mu$-almost everywhere, then redefining the limit function arbitrarily on a null set preserves measurability and leaves all integrals unchanged. Hence the theorem still holds.
4. (Foundational role.) The proof uses only: (i) monotonicity of the integral for non-negative measurable functions; (ii) that $A\mapsto\int_A s\,d\mu$ is a measure for simple $s$; and (iii) continuity from below of measures. Thus the lemma can be used to derive further basic properties (e.g. linearity) of the Lebesgue integral.
5. (Relaxing the monotonicity assumption.) Under similar hypotheses, one can relax monotonicity. Let $(\Omega,\Sigma,\mu)$ be a measure space, $X\in\Sigma$, and let $\{f_k\}_{k\ge 1}$ be non-negative measurable functions on $X$ such that $f_k(x)\to f(x)$ for a.e. $x$ and $f_k\le f$ a.e. for all $k$. Then $f$ is measurable, the limit $\displaystyle\lim_{k\to\infty}\int_X f_k\,d\mu$ exists, and $\displaystyle \lim_{k\to\infty}\int_X f_k\,d\mu \;=\; \int_X f\,d\mu.$

=== Proof based on Fatou's lemma ===
The proof can also be based on Fatou's lemma instead of a direct proof as above, because Fatou's lemma can be proved independent of the monotone convergence theorem. However the monotone convergence theorem is in some ways more primitive than Fatou's lemma. It easily follows from the monotone convergence theorem and proof of Fatou's lemma is similar and arguably slightly less natural than the proof above.

As before, measurability follows from the fact that $f = \sup_k f_k = \lim_{k \to \infty} f_k = \liminf_{k \to \infty}f_k$ almost everywhere. The interchange of limits and integrals is then an easy consequence of Fatou's lemma. One has
$$\int_X f\,d\mu = \int_X \liminf_k f_k\,d\mu \le \liminf \int_X f_k\,d\mu$$
by Fatou's lemma, and then, since $\int f_k \,d\mu \le \int f_{k + 1} \,d\mu \le \int f d\mu$ (monotonicity),
$$\liminf \int_X f_k\,d\mu \le \limsup_k \int_X f_k\,d\mu = \sup_k \int_X f_k\,d\mu \le \int_X f\,d\mu.$$
Therefore
$$\int_X f \, d\mu = \liminf_{k \to\infty} \int_X f_k\,d\mu = \limsup_{k \to\infty} \int_X f_k\,d\mu = \lim_{k \to\infty} \int_X f_k \, d\mu = \sup_k \int_X f_k\,d\mu.$$

== See also ==
- Infinite series
- Dominated convergence theorem
