= Swash (disambiguation) =

Swash may refer to:

- Swash, the water that washes up on shore after an incoming wave has broken
- Swash (brand), a range of laundry products produced by Procter & Gamble
- Swash (appliance), a Whirlpool corporation appliance
- Swash (typography), a typographical flourish on a glyph
- SWASH (water, sanitation and hygiene), a public health term used in schools

== People with the surname Swash ==
- Joe Swash (born 1982), British actor
- Shana Swash (born 1990), British actress

== See also ==
- Wash (disambiguation)
- Swashbuckler (disambiguation)
