= Washer =

Washer most commonly refers to:

- Washer (hardware), a thin usually disc-shaped plate with a hole in the middle typically used with a bolt or nut
- Washing machine, for cleaning clothes

Washer may also refer to:

- Dishwasher, a machine for cleaning dishware, cookware and cutlery
- Dishwasher (occupation), a person who cleans dishware, cookware and cutlery
- Washer, a person with obsessive-compulsive disorder who compulsively engage in hand washing
- Washer method, a mathematical formula for finding volume
- Washer pitching, an outdoor game involving tossing discs at a target

== People with the surname ==
- Arthur Washer (1855–1910), New Zealand cricketer
- Buck Washer (1882–1955), American baseball pitcher
- Jean Washer (1894–1972), Belgian tennis player
- Mal Washer (born 1945), Australian politician
- Paul Washer (born 1961), American Christian preacher
- Philippe Washer (1924–2015), Belgian tennis player and son of Jean Washer
- Thomas Washer, Virginia colonist and politician in the 17th century
- Tim Washer, American comedian and producer

== See also ==
- Wash (disambiguation)
- Washing
