= Wash =

Wash or the Wash may refer to:

== Industry and sanitation ==
- WASH or WaSH, "water, sanitation and hygiene", three related public health issues
- Wash (distilling), the liquid produced by the fermentation step in the production of distilled beverages
- Lime wash or whitewash, a low-cost industrial paint

== Places ==
=== England ===
- The Wash, the square-mouthed estuary on the northwest margin of East Anglia in England
- Wash, Derbyshire, a hamlet in Derbyshire, England

=== United States ===
- Wash Creek, a stream in North Carolina
- Washington (state), U.S. state sometimes abbreviated as "Wash."
- Blanchard Park, Pomona College, California, commonly known as the Wash
- Clio, California, formerly known as Wash

== People ==
- Wash (pharaoh), an ancient Egyptian predynastic ruler
- Wash (singer), an American singer
- Wash Hendry (1838–1914), also known as George W. Hendry, American Florida early settler
- Martha Wash (born 1953), American singer-songwriter and actress
- Todd Wash (born 1968), American football coach

== Art, entertainment, and media ==
- WASH (FM), a radio station serving the Washington, D.C. area
- Wash (visual arts), a technique of applying a semi-transparent layer of color

=== Film and television ===
- The Wash (1988 film), film by Philip Kan Gotanda, based on his play The Wash (1985)
- The Wash (2001 film), a hip-hop styled film
- Wash, a 2024 Japanese film starring Naoko Ken
- Wash (Firefly), a character on Firefly
- "Wash" (Prison Break episode), an episode of Prison Break

=== Music ===
- "Wash" (song), by Pearl Jam, 2003
- "The Wash" (song), by Dr. Dre and Snoop Dogg, 2002
- "Wash.", a song by Bon Iver from Bon Iver, 2011
- "Wash", a song by Lifehouse from Stanley Climbfall, 2002
- "Washed", by Elevation Rhythm, 2025

== Topography ==
- Wash, an area of washland intended to be flooded when river levels are high
- Arroyo (watercourse) or wash, a dry creek bed or gulch that temporarily fills with water after a heavy rain

== See also ==
- Car wash (disambiguation)
- Washer (disambiguation)
- Washing
- Washington (disambiguation), various uses commonly abbreviated as "Wash."
