= Car wash (disambiguation) =

A car wash is a facility for cleaning automobiles.

Car wash or carwash may also refer to:

== Arts, entertainment, and media ==
=== Films and soundtracks ===
- Car Wash (film), a 1976 film
  - Car Wash (soundtrack), a soundtrack album to the 1976 film
    - "Car Wash" (song), a song by Rose Royce from the 1976 film soundtrack, later covered by Christina Aguilera and Missy Elliott

=== Television ===
(Alphabetical by series title)

- "Car Wash" (1999), a season 3 episode of Ally McBeal
- "Car Wash" (sometimes "Carwash") (1993), a season 3 episode of Beavis and Butt-head
- "Car Wash" (2000), a season 2 episode of Cousin Skeeter
- "Car Wash" (2008), a season 2 episode of Genie in the House
- "Car Wash" (2008), a season 15 episode of Modern Marvels
- "Car Wash" (2005), an episode of MTV's The 70s House
- "Car Wash" (2001), an episode of The Geena Davis Show
- "Car Wash" (2003), a season 1 episode of The Sleepover Club

=== Other arts, entertainment, and media ===
- Car Wash, a character in the BBC television series Willo the Wisp
- "Car Wash", a song by Bruce Springsteen of his rarities collection boxset Tracks (1998)
- "Car Wash", a skit on Rob Schneider's comedy album Registered Offender (2010)

== Other uses ==
- Johnny Carwash, a nickname of Italian racing driver Giovanni Lavaggi (born 1958)
- Operation Car Wash (Portuguese: Operação Lava Jato), an anti-corruption investigation in Brazil
