= Disc integration =

Integration method to calculate volume

Animation of a curve being rotated to sweep out a surface. The surface is filled with many short cylinders, illustrating the disc method of integration for volume.

Disc integration, also known in integral calculus as the disc method, is a method for calculating the volume of a solid of revolution of a solid-state material when integrating along an axis parallel to the axis of revolution. This method models the resulting three-dimensional shape as a stack of an infinite number of discs of varying radius and infinitesimal thickness. It is also possible to use the same principles with rings instead of discs (the "washer method") to obtain hollow solids of revolution. This is in contrast to shell integration, which integrates along an axis perpendicular to the axis of revolution.

== Definition ==
=== Function of x ===
If the function to be revolved is a function of x, the following integral represents the volume of the solid of revolution:

$$\pi\int_a^b R(x)^2\,dx$$

where R(x) is the distance between the function and the axis of rotation. This works only if the axis of rotation is horizontal (example: y = 3 or some other constant).

=== Function of y ===
If the function to be revolved is a function of y, the following integral will obtain the volume of the solid of revolution:

$$\pi\int_c^d R(y)^2\,dy$$

where R(y) is the distance between the function and the axis of rotation. This works only if the axis of rotation is vertical (example: x = 4 or some other constant).

=== Washer method ===
To obtain a hollow solid of revolution (the “washer method”), the procedure would be to take the volume of the inner solid of revolution and subtract it from the volume of the outer solid of revolution. This can be calculated in a single integral similar to the following:

$$\pi\int_a^b\left(R_\mathrm{O}(x)^2 - R_\mathrm{I}(x)^2\right)\,dx$$

where R_{O}(x) is the function that is furthest from the axis of rotation and R_{I}(x) is the function that is closest to the axis of rotation. For example, the next figure shows the rotation along the x-axis of the red "leaf" enclosed between the square-root and quadratic curves:

Rotation about x-axis

The volume of this solid is:

$$\pi\int_0^1\left(\left(\sqrt{x}\right)^2 - \left(x^2\right)^2 \right)\,dx\,.$$

One should take caution not to evaluate the square of the difference of the two functions, but to evaluate the difference of the squares of the two functions.

$$R_\mathrm{O}(x)^2 - R_\mathrm{I}(x)^2 \neq \left(R_\mathrm{O}(x) - R_\mathrm{I}(x)\right)^2$$

(This formula only works for revolutions about the x-axis.)

To rotate about any horizontal axis, simply subtract from that axis from each formula. If h is the value of a horizontal axis, then the volume equals

$$\pi\int_a^b\left(\left(h-R_\mathrm{O}(x)\right)^2 - \left(h-R_\mathrm{I}(x)\right)^2\right)\,dx\,.$$

For example, to rotate the region between y = −2x + x^{2} and y = x along the axis y = 4, one would integrate as follows:

$$\pi\int_0^3\left(\left(4-\left(-2x+x^2\right)\right)^2 - (4-x)^2\right)\,dx\,.$$

The bounds of integration are the zeros of the first equation minus the second. Note that when integrating along an axis other than the x, the graph of the function which is furthest from the axis of rotation may not be obvious. In the previous example, even though the graph of y = x is, with respect to the x-axis, further up than the graph of y = −2x + x^{2}, with respect to the axis of rotation the function y = x is the inner function: its graph is closer to y = 4 or the equation of the axis of rotation in the example.

The same idea can be applied to both the y-axis and any other vertical axis. One simply must solve each equation for x before one inserts them into the integration formula.

== See also ==
- Solid of revolution
- Shell integration
