= Volume integral =

Integral over a 3-D domain

In mathematics (particularly multivariable calculus), a volume integral (∭) is an integral over a 3-dimensional domain; that is, it is a special case of multiple integrals. Volume integrals are especially important in physics for many applications, for example, to calculate flux densities, or to calculate mass from a corresponding density function.

== In coordinates ==
Often the volume integral is represented in terms of a differential volume element $dV=dx\, dy\, dz$. $\iiint_D f(x,y,z)\,dV.$ It can also mean a triple integral within a region $D \subset \R^3$ of a function $f(x,y,z),$ and is usually written as: $\iiint_D f(x,y,z)\,dx\,dy\,dz.$ A volume integral in cylindrical coordinates is $\iiint_D f(\rho,\varphi,z) \rho \,d\rho \,d\varphi \,dz,$ and a volume integral in spherical coordinates (using the ISO convention for angles with $\varphi$ as the azimuth and $\theta$ measured from the polar axis (see more on conventions)) has the form $\iiint_D f(r,\theta,\varphi) r^2 \sin\theta \,dr \,d\theta\, d\varphi .$ The triple integral can be transformed from Cartesian coordinates to any arbitrary coordinate system using the Jacobian matrix and determinant. Suppose we have a transformation of coordinates from $(x,y,z)\mapsto(u,v,w)$. We can represent the integral as the following. $\iiint_D f(x,y,z)\,dx\,dy\,dz=\iiint_D f(u,v,w)\left|\frac{\partial (x,y,z)}{\partial (u,v,w)}\right|\,du\,dv\,dw$ Where we define the Jacobian determinant to be.
$$\mathbf{J}=\frac{\partial (x,y,z)}{\partial (u,v,w)}=
\begin{vmatrix}
\frac{\partial x}{\partial u}& \frac{\partial x}{\partial v}& \frac{\partial x}{\partial w}\\
\frac{\partial y}{\partial u}& \frac{\partial y}{\partial v}& \frac{\partial y}{\partial w}\\
\frac{\partial z}{\partial u}& \frac{\partial z}{\partial v}& \frac{\partial z}{\partial w}\\
\end{vmatrix}$$

== Example ==
Integrating the equation $f(x,y,z) = 1$ over a unit cube yields the following result: $\int_0^1 \int_0^1 \int_0^1 1 \,dx \,dy \,dz = \int_0^1 \int_0^1 (1 - 0) \,dy \,dz = \int_0^1 \left(1 - 0\right) dz = 1 - 0 = 1$

So the volume of the unit cube is 1 as expected. This is rather trivial however, and a volume integral is far more powerful. For instance if we have a scalar density function on the unit cube then the volume integral will give the total mass of the cube. For example for density function:
$$\begin{cases}
f: \R^3 \to \R \\
f: (x,y,z) \mapsto x+y+z
\end{cases}$$
the total mass of the cube is: $\int_0^1 \int_0^1 \int_0^1 (x+y+z) \,dx \,dy \,dz = \int_0^1 \int_0^1 \left(\frac 1 2 + y + z\right) dy \,dz = \int_0^1 (1 + z) \, dz = \frac 3 2$

== See also ==
- Divergence theorem
- Surface integral
- Volume element
- Line element
- Line integral
