= Tim Washer =

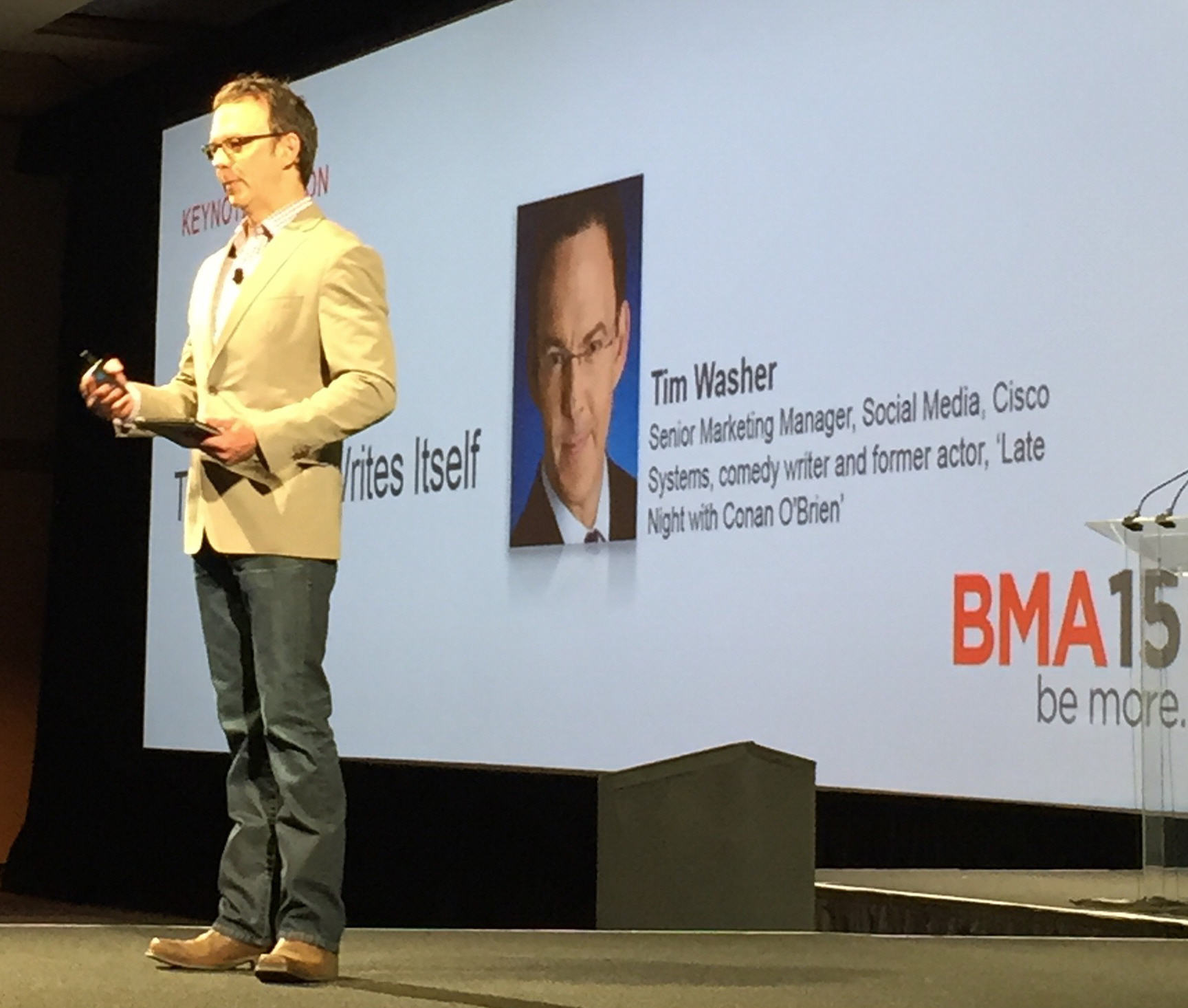
- Tim Washer speaking at the Business Marketing Association, May 29, 2015. Source: TopRank Online Marketing
- Education: Texas A&M; BBA; 1985 – 1989; University of Texas at Austin; Red McCombs School of Business; MBA, Technology, Marketing; 1994 – 1996
- Occupations: Comedian, video producer, corporate humorist, content marketing specialist
- Website: www.timwasher.com vimeo.com/timwasher

Tim Washer is a stand-up comedian, a video producer, and corporate humorist.

He graduated from Texas A&M University in 1989 with a BBA and from University of Texas at Austin in 1996 with an MBA, then pursued parallel careers in business and show business.

In the corporate world, After working for Accenture, he rose to vice-president of interactive research with NFO Interactive, a market research company. From 2004-2010, he was head of social media video production for IBM and, beginning in 2010, is now a social media manager for Cisco Systems’ Service Provider Marketing group.

He says comedy creates a positive feeling in prospective customers when used in business-to-business content marketing. Washer has emceed events featuring Pixar CEO John Lasseter, Emmy-Winner Tony Hale, and Nobel Peace Prize winner Desmond Tutu. He has performed at corporate events for IBM, Cisco, Deloitte, Control Data Corporation, and Google. He helped create a series of three video to promote David Meerman Scott's book, World Wide Rave. Washer's TV commercials include a spot for T-Mobile with Catherine Zeta-Jones and a Super Bowl commercial for Dunkin' Donuts.

His comedic acting and writing activities include studying improv under Amy Poehler and comedy writing with Tom Purcell. He was executive producer of The Colbert Report, and has appeared on Saturday Night Live, Late Night with Conan O'Brien, Onion Sports Network, and HBO’s Last Week Tonight with John Oliver. He was a writer for Saturday Night Live segments for Tina Fey. Washer also writes for James Corden.

Washer was a 2013 Webby Honoree as Producer of "Phone Company in a Box: Developing Commerce in Africa" in the online film and video for technology category. For Apple TV, he interviewed Tony Hale about his role in Veep.
