= Swashbuckler (disambiguation) =

A swashbuckler is a rough, loud and boastful adventurer.

Swashbuckler may also refer to:

- The Swashbuckler, an alternate English-language title for the 1971 French film The Married Couple of the Year Two
- Swashbuckler (film), a 1976 film
- Swashbuckler (Dungeons & Dragons), a character class in the role-playing game
- Swashbuckler (video game), published in 1982 by Datamost
- Swashbuckler (board game), a 1980 game from Yaquinto
- Swashbuckler films, a genre of film
- Swashbuckler (comics), the nephew of Vigilante (Greg Saunders)
- The former name of the Tampa Bay Buccaneers Cheerleaders
- Louisiana Swashbucklers, an indoor football team

Swashbuckle may also refer to:

- Swashbuckle (band), a pirate-themed American thrash-metal band
- Swashbuckle (TV series), a British children's television show on the CBeebies channel
