= Registered Offender =

Studio album by Rob Schneider
- Released: July 2010
- Recorded: 2007–2009
- Genre: Sketch comedy
- Label: Oglio Records

Registered Offender is the debut comedy album by actor and stand-up comedian Rob Schneider. Released in July 2010 by Oglio Records, it contains a mixture of sketches and songs, with all voices performed by Schneider. The content is adult in nature and features various scatological references. The album was recorded at various times and locations during 2007–2009. A 7" vinyl single of the musical track "She's Gonna Come" b/w "Swain the Legend" was released simultaneously with the CD version of the album.

== Background ==
"She's Gonna Come" features Schneider backed by a studio ensemble dubbed the Fabulous Dunderheads - which consists of members of the San Diego, CA-based alternative rock band The Night Marchers, led by former Rocket from the Crypt singer/guitarist John Reis.

== Track listing ==
1. What I Want
2. Iraq Love
3. Yoko and Julian
4. She's Gonna Come
5. Swain the Legend
6. Virtual Kidnappers
7. Car Wash
8. The Perfect S--t
9. Agent for Porn Stars
10. Sex Offenders
11. The Liar Corp.
12. Welcome to the Jungle
13. Sea of J--z
14. Mom and Dad Party
15. Graduation Speech
16. Hidden Bonus Track
