= Solid of revolution =

Type of three-dimensional shape

Rotating a curve. The surface formed is a surface of revolution; it encloses a solid of revolution.

Solids of revolution (Matemateca Ime-Usp)

In geometry, a solid of revolution is a solid figure obtained by rotating a plane figure around some straight line (the axis of revolution), which may not intersect the generatrix (except at its boundary). The surface created by this revolution and which bounds the solid is the surface of revolution.

Assuming that the curve does not cross the axis, the solid's volume is equal to the length of the circle described by the figure's centroid multiplied by the figure's area (Pappus's second centroid theorem).

A representative disc is a three-dimensional volume element of a solid of revolution. The element is created by rotating a line segment (of length w) around some axis (located r units away), so that a cylindrical volume of πr^{2}w units is enclosed.

== Finding the volume ==
Two common methods for finding the volume of a solid of revolution are the disc method and the shell method of integration. To apply these methods, it is easiest to draw the graph in question; identify the area that is to be revolved about the axis of revolution; determine the volume of either a disc-shaped slice of the solid, with thickness δx, or a cylindrical shell of width δx; and then find the limiting sum of these volumes as δx approaches 0, a value which may be found by evaluating a suitable integral. A more rigorous justification can be given by attempting to evaluate a triple integral in cylindrical coordinates with two different orders of integration.

=== Disc method ===
Disc integration about the y-axis

The disc method is used when the slice that was drawn is perpendicular to the axis of revolution; i.e. when integrating parallel to the axis of revolution.

The volume of the solid formed by rotating the area between the curves of f(y) and g(y) and the lines y = a and y = b about the y-axis is given by
$$V = \pi \int_a^b \left| f(y)^2 - g(y)^2\right|\,dy\, .$$
If g(y) = 0 (e.g. revolving an area between the curve and the y-axis), this reduces to:
$$V = \pi \int_a^b f(y)^2 \,dy\, .$$

The method can be visualized by considering a thin horizontal rectangle at y between f(y) on top and g(y) on the bottom, and revolving it about the y-axis; it forms a ring (or disc in the case that g(y) = 0), with outer radius f(y) and inner radius g(y). The area of a ring is π(R^{2} − r^{2}), where R is the outer radius (in this case f(y)), and r is the inner radius (in this case g(y)). The volume of each infinitesimal disc is therefore πf(y)^{2} dy. The limit of the Riemann sum of the volumes of the discs between a and b becomes integral (1).

Assuming the applicability of Fubini's theorem and the multivariate change of variables formula, the disk method may be derived in a straightforward manner by (denoting the solid as D):
$$V = \iiint_D dV = \int_a^b \int_{g(z)}^{f(z)} \int_0^{2\pi} r\,d\theta\,dr\,dz = 2\pi \int_a^b\int_{g(z)}^{f(z)} r\,dr\,dz = 2\pi \int_a^b \frac{1}{2}r^2\Vert^{f(z)}_{g(z)} \,dz = \pi \int_a^b (f(z)^2 - g(z)^2)\,dz$$

=== Shell Method of Integration ===
Shell integration

The shell method (sometimes referred to as the "cylinder method") is used when the slice that was drawn is parallel to the axis of revolution; i.e. when integrating perpendicular to the axis of revolution.

The volume of the solid formed by rotating the area between the curves of f(x) and g(x) and the lines x = a and x = b about the y-axis is given by
$$V = 2\pi \int_a^b x |f(x) - g(x)|\, dx\, .$$
If g(x) = 0 (e.g. revolving an area between curve and x-axis), this reduces to:
$$V = 2\pi \int_a^b x | f(x) | \,dx\, .$$

The method can be visualized by considering a thin vertical rectangle at x with height f(x) − g(x), and revolving it about the y-axis; it forms a cylindrical shell. The lateral surface area of a cylinder is 2πrh, where r is the radius (in this case x), and h is the height (in this case f(x) − g(x)). Summing up all of the surface areas along the interval gives the total volume.

This method may be derived with the same triple integral, this time with a different order of integration:
$$V = \iiint_D dV = \int_a^b \int_{g(r)}^{f(r)} \int_0^{2\pi} r\,d\theta\,dz\,dr = 2\pi \int_a^b\int_{g(r)}^{f(r)} r\,dz\,dr = 2\pi\int_a^b r(f(r) - g(r))\,dr.$$

Solid of revolution demonstration

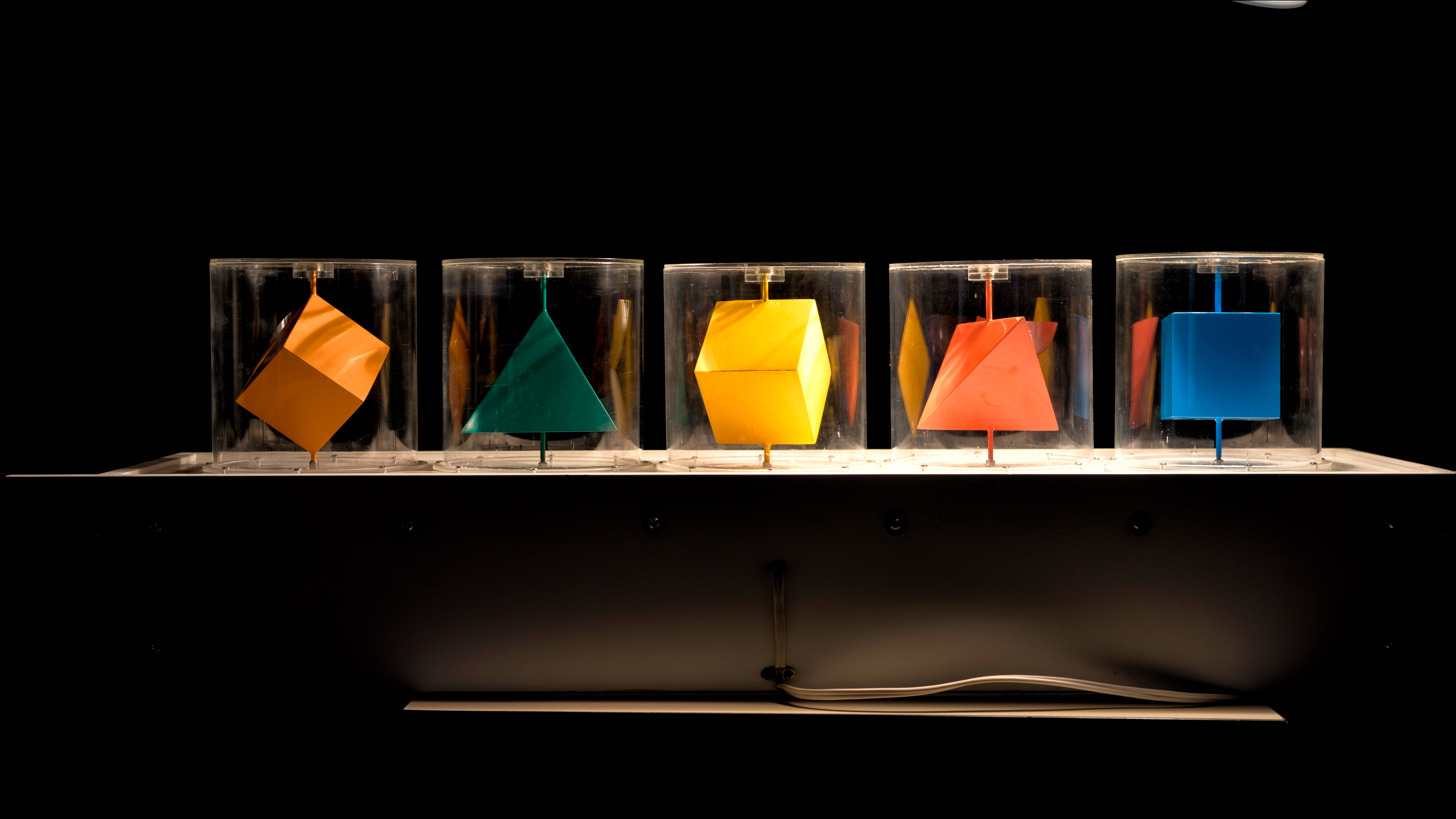
The shapes at rest

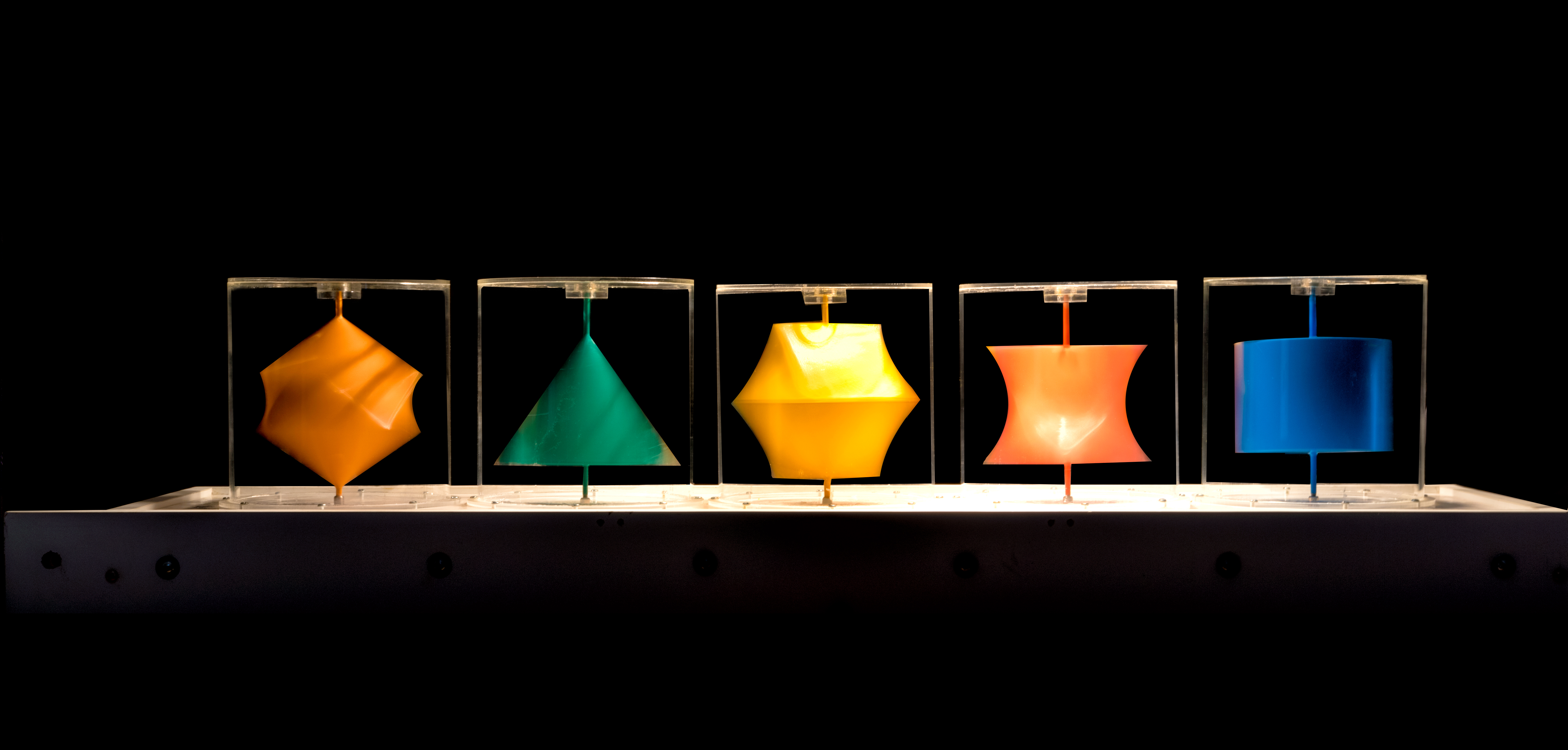
The shapes in motion, showing the solids of revolution formed by each

== Parametric form ==
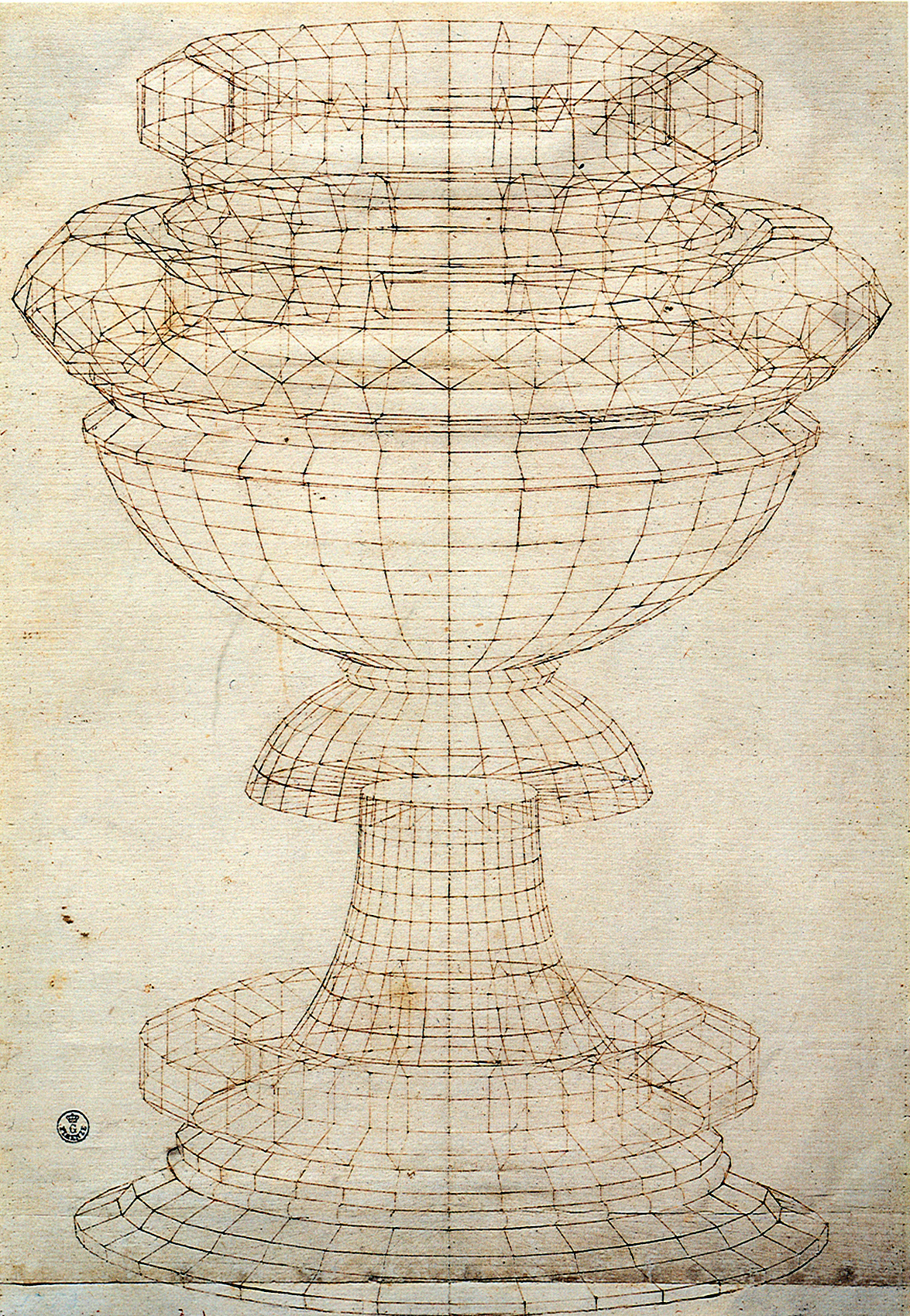
Mathematics and art: study of a vase as a solid of revolution by Paolo Uccello. 15th century

When a curve is defined by its parametric form (x(t),y(t)) in some interval [a,b], the volumes of the solids generated by revolving the curve around the x-axis or the y-axis are given by
$$\begin{align}
V_x &= \int_a^b \pi y^2 \, \frac{dx}{dt} \, dt \, , \\
V_y &= \int_a^b \pi x^2 \, \frac{dy}{dt} \, dt \, .
\end{align}$$

Under the same circumstances the areas of the surfaces of the solids generated by revolving the curve around the x-axis or the y-axis are given by
$$\begin{align}
A_x &= \int_a^b 2 \pi y \, \sqrt{ \left( \frac{dx}{dt} \right)^2 + \left( \frac{dy}{dt} \right)^2} \, dt \, , \\
A_y &= \int_a^b 2 \pi x \, \sqrt{ \left( \frac{dx}{dt} \right)^2 + \left( \frac{dy}{dt} \right)^2} \, dt \, .
\end{align}$$

This can also be derived from multivariable integration. If a plane curve is given by $\langle x(t), y(t) \rangle$ then its corresponding surface of revolution when revolved around the x-axis has Cartesian coordinates given by $\mathbf{r}(t, \theta) = \langle y(t)\cos(\theta), y(t)\sin(\theta), x(t)\rangle$ with $0 \leq \theta \leq 2\pi$. Then the surface area is given by the surface integral
$$A_x = \iint_S dS = \iint_{[a, b] \times [0, 2\pi]} \left\|\frac{\partial \mathbf{r}}{\partial t} \times \frac{\partial \mathbf{r}}{\partial \theta}\right\|\ d\theta\ dt = \int_a^b \int_0^{2\pi} \left\|\frac{\partial \mathbf{r}}{\partial t} \times \frac{\partial \mathbf{r}}{\partial \theta}\right\|\ d\theta\ dt.$$

Computing the partial derivatives yields
$$\frac{\partial \mathbf{r}}{\partial t} = \left\langle \frac{dy}{dt} \cos(\theta), \frac{dy}{dt} \sin(\theta), \frac{dx}{dt} \right\rangle,$$
$$\frac{\partial \mathbf{r}}{\partial \theta} = \left\langle -y \sin(\theta), y \cos(\theta), 0 \right\rangle$$
and computing the cross product yields
$$\frac{\partial \mathbf{r}}{\partial t} \times \frac{\partial \mathbf{r}}{\partial \theta} = \left\langle y \cos(\theta)\frac{dx}{dt}, y \sin(\theta)\frac{dx}{dt}, y \frac{dy}{dt} \right\rangle = y \left\langle \cos(\theta)\frac{dx}{dt}, \sin(\theta)\frac{dx}{dt}, \frac{dy}{dt} \right\rangle$$
where the trigonometric identity $\sin^2(\theta) + \cos^2(\theta) = 1$ was used. With this cross product, we get
$$\begin{align}
A_x
&= \int_a^b \int_0^{2\pi} \left\|\frac{\partial \mathbf{r}}{\partial t} \times \frac{\partial \mathbf{r}}{\partial \theta}\right\|\ d\theta\ dt \\[1ex]
&= \int_a^b \int_0^{2\pi} \left\| \left\langle y \cos(\theta)\frac{dx}{dt}, y \sin(\theta)\frac{dx}{dt}, y \frac{dy}{dt} \right\rangle\right\|\ d\theta\ dt \\[1ex]
&= \int_a^b \int_0^{2\pi} y \sqrt{\cos^2(\theta)\left(\frac{dx}{dt} \right)^2 + \sin^2(\theta)\left(\frac{dx}{dt}\right)^2 + \left(\frac{dy}{dt}\right)^2}\ d\theta\ dt \\[1ex]
&= \int_a^b \int_0^{2\pi} y \sqrt{\left(\frac{dx}{dt} \right)^2 + \left(\frac{dy}{dt} \right)^2}\ d\theta\ dt \\[1ex]
&= \int_a^b 2\pi y \sqrt{\left(\frac{dx}{dt} \right)^2 + \left(\frac{dy}{dt} \right)^2}\ dt
\end{align}$$
where the same trigonometric identity was used again. The derivation for a surface obtained by revolving around the y-axis is similar.

== Polar form ==
For a polar curve $r=f(\theta)$ where $\alpha\leq \theta\leq \beta$ and $f(\theta) \geq 0$, the volumes of the solids generated by revolving the curve around the x-axis or y-axis are
$$\begin{align}
V_x &= \int_\alpha^\beta \left(\pi r^2\sin^2{\theta} \cos{\theta}\, \frac{dr}{d\theta}-\pi r^3\sin^3{\theta}\right)d\theta\,, \\
V_y &= \int_\alpha^\beta \left(\pi r^2\sin{\theta} \cos^2{\theta}\, \frac{dr}{d\theta}+\pi r^3\cos^3{\theta}\right)d\theta \, .
\end{align}$$

The areas of the surfaces of the solids generated by revolving the curve around the x-axis or the y-axis are given
$$\begin{align}
A_x &= \int_\alpha^\beta 2 \pi r\sin{\theta} \, \sqrt{ r^2 + \left( \frac{dr}{d\theta} \right)^2} \, d\theta \, , \\
A_y &= \int_\alpha^\beta 2 \pi r\cos{\theta} \, \sqrt{ r^2 + \left( \frac{dr}{d\theta} \right)^2} \, d\theta \, ,
\end{align}$$

== See also ==
- Cylindrical symmetry
- Gabriel's Horn
- Guldinus theorem
- Pseudosphere
- Surface of revolution
- Ungula
