= Wash Creek =

Stream in Henderson County, North Carolina, U.S.

Coordinates: 35°18′29″N 82°27′34″W

Wash Creek is a stream in Henderson County, North Carolina, in the United States.

Wash Creek may have been named from the fact women washed their laundry in it, according to local history.

== See also ==
- List of rivers of North Carolina
