= Forests of Mexico =

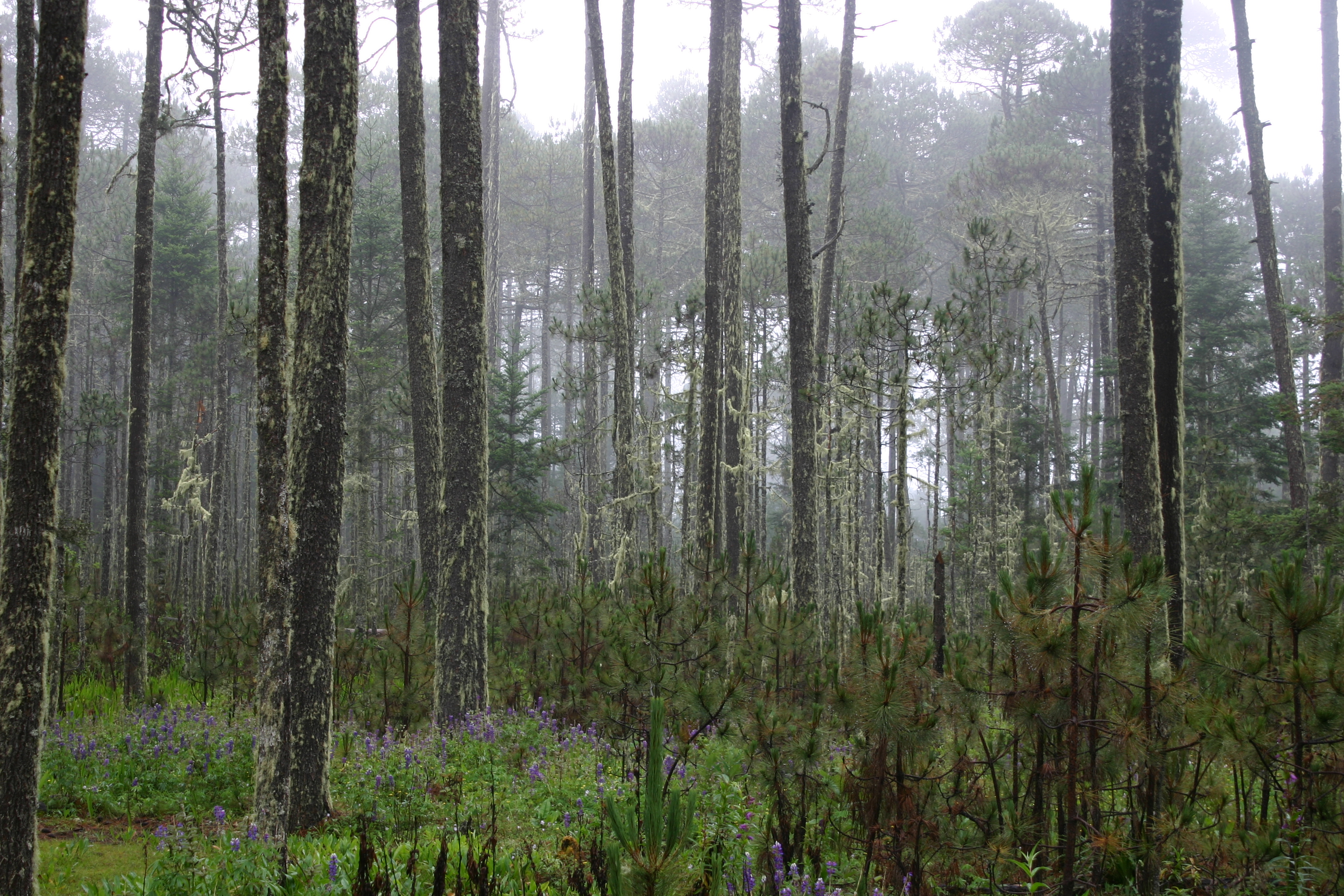
Forest in the Sierra Juárez of Oaxaca.

The forests of Mexico cover a surface area of about 64 million hectares, or 34.5% of the country. These forests are categorized by the type of tree and biome: tropical forests, temperate forests, cloud forests, riparian forests, deciduous, evergreen, dry, moist, etc.. The agency in charge of Mexico's forests is the National Forestry Commission (Comisión Nacional Forestal). Despite major reforms to the Constitution in 1992 regarding private land, Mexico enacted major forest regulation laws in 1998 and 2003. Though no longer required to enforce land regulation in Mexico, Article 27 of the Constitution also still permits the Government to enact land regulation.

== History ==
Forest areas were historically part of indigenous communities' commons for hunting, gathering, and fuel. Areas of Mexico were deforested in the prehispanic period around Teotihuacan. In the colonial era, forests were a source of timber for construction, for fuel in smelting metals, and for household fuel. Forested lands were included in indigenous community lands in the colonial era. In the late nineteenth century, during the Proficiat (1876-1910), the national government ignored previous practices of leaving many forested areas in the hands of indigenous communities began implementing forest management policies and unfettered exploitation of woodlands for their timber and water resources. Wood was used for construction and fuel, as well as in the Puebla-Tlaxcala region, for pulp paper. In Chihuahua and in Michoacán and forests were exploited by timber companies. One scholar argues that the change in practice politicized the forested landscape and was an aspect of the commodification of nature, with liberal economic policies undermined collective indigenous rights to land and its resources. Although forests had historically been utilized, the late nineteenth century marked the beginning of industrial-scale exploitation.

== Tropical rainforests ==
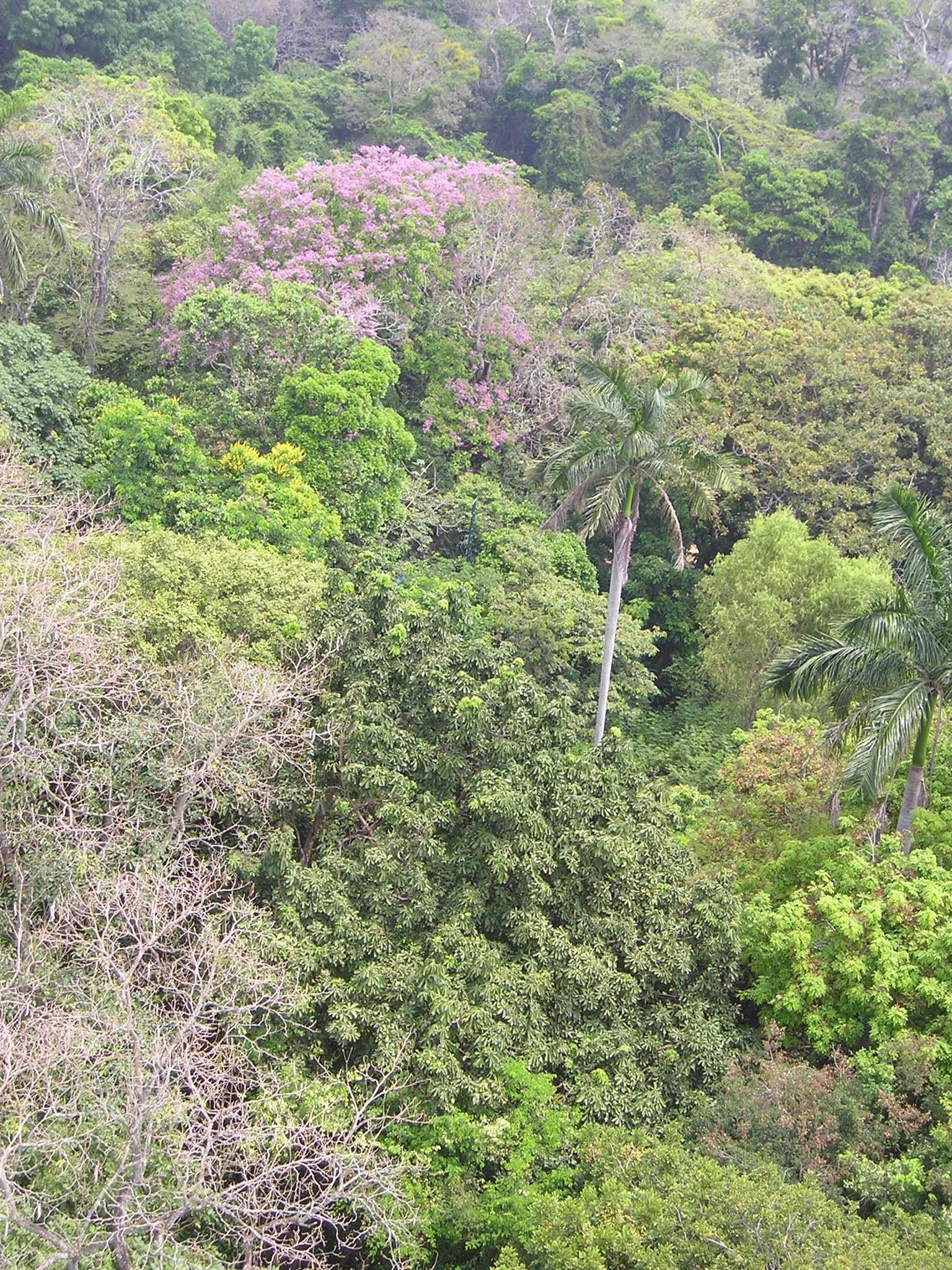
Tropical rainforest canopy at the Parque-Museo La Venta (open-air museum of La Venta).

Rainforests are found predominantly along the southeastern Atlantic coast, in regions with frequent rain and warm temperatures that allow for plants to retain their foliage year-round. The average rainfall in these forests is above 2,000 mm and temperature is always higher than 18 °C, with little variation (usually staying between 23 °C and 25 °C).

=== Lacandon Jungle ===
The Lacandon Jungle is an area of rainforest which stretches from Chiapas into Guatemala and into the southern part of the Yucatán Peninsula. The heart of this rainforest is located in the Montes Azules Biosphere Reserve in Chiapas near the border with Guatemala in the Montañas del Oriente region of the state. Although most of the jungle outside the reserve has been partially or completely destroyed and damage continues inside the reserve, the Lacandon is still the largest montane rainforest in North America and one of the last ones left large enough to support jaguars. It contains 1,500 tree species, 33% of all Mexican bird species, 25% of all Mexican animal species, 44% of all Mexican diurnal butterflies and 10% of all Mexico's fish species.

== Temperate forests ==
Mexico is home to 50 species of pine (about half of pine species) and about 200 species of oak (about a third of oak species). It is estimated that temperate forests in Mexico contain about 7,000 species of plants.

=== Monarch butterfly forests ===
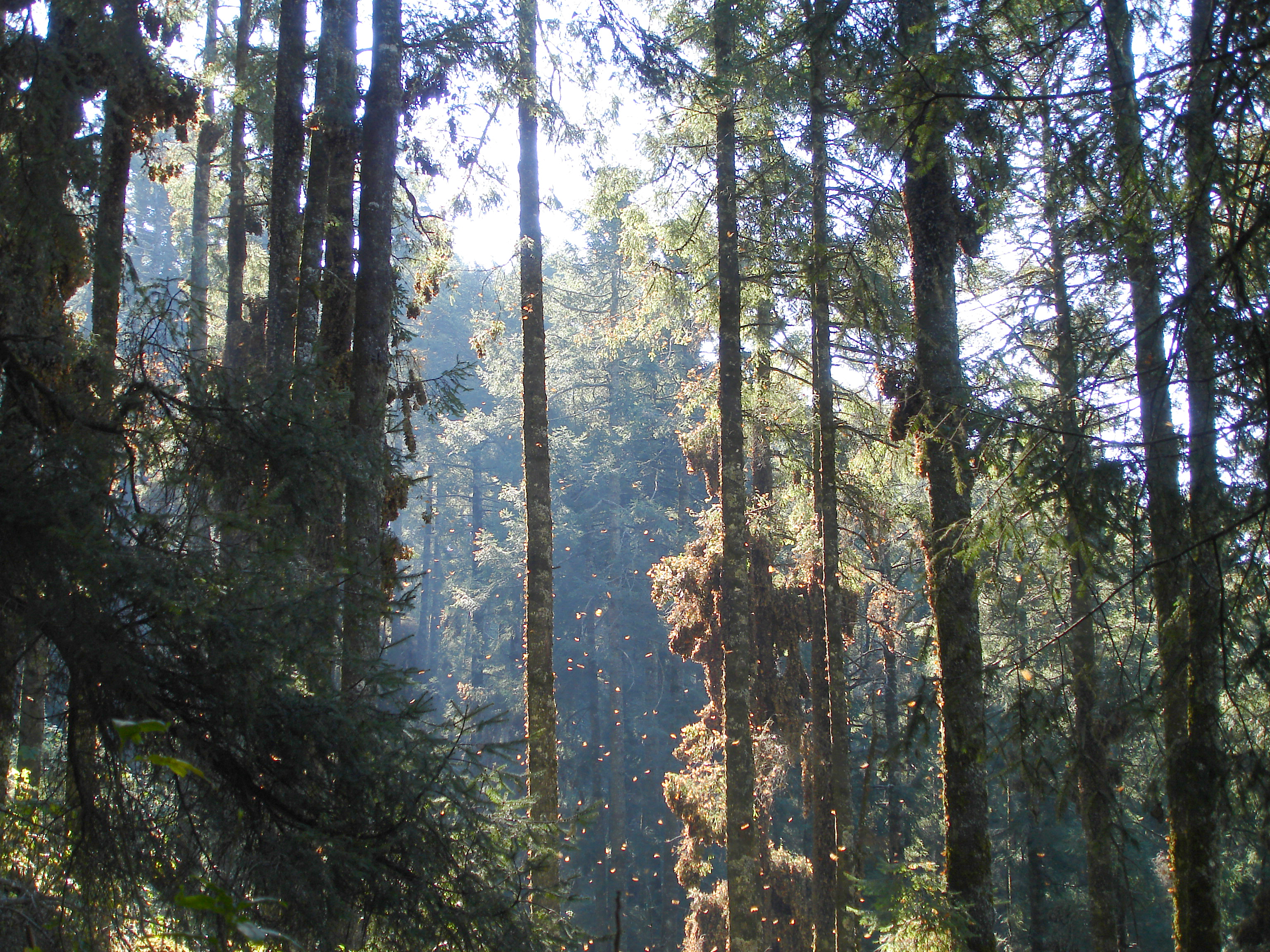
Monarch butterflies clustering on the trunks and branches of oyamels.

The Monarch Butterfly Biosphere Reserve contains the over-wintering habitats of the eastern population of the monarch butterfly. The reserve is located in the Trans-Mexican Volcanic Belt pine-oak forests ecoregion on the border of Michoacán and Mexico State. Millions of butterflies arrive in the preserve annually. Butterflies only inhabit a fraction of the 56,000 hectares of the reserve from October–March. The biosphere's mission is not only to protect the butterfly species, but its habitat as well. The composition of the forest varies with altitude:

- oak species up to 2900 metres above sea level
- oak and pines between 1500 and 3000 masl
- oyamel fir between 2400 and 3600 masl.

== Tropical and subtropical dry forests ==
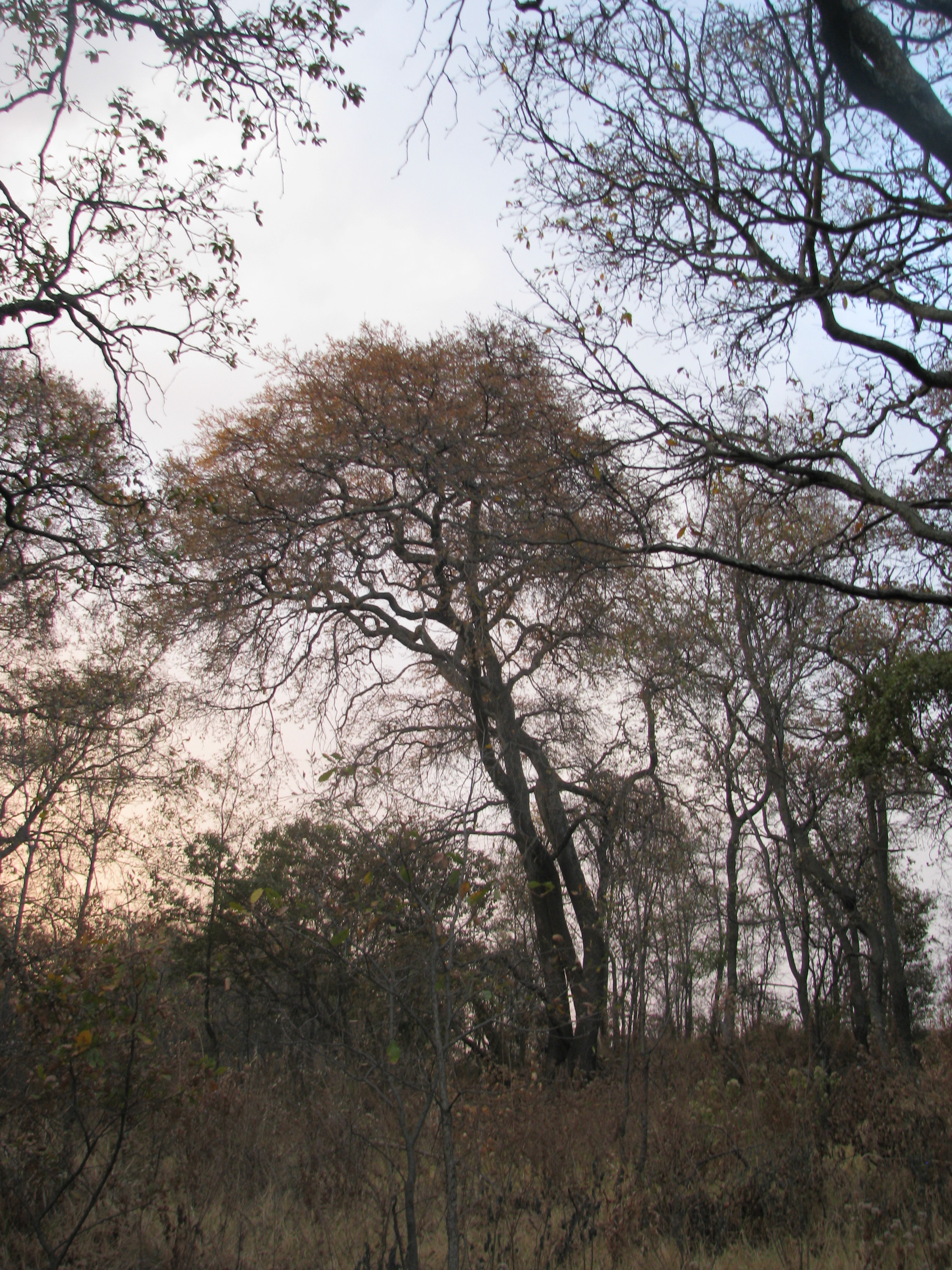
Dry pine-oak forest during the dry season

Paralleling the Pacific Coast in southwestern Mexico is a series of diverse tropical dry forests, adapted to an absence of rainfall for certain months of the year. Many trees here drop their leaves during the dry season but warm temperatures help to nurture plant life, which in turns supports a large number of animal species.

The global ecoregion is made up of eight terrestrial ecoregions: Jalisco dry forests; Balsas dry forests; Bajío dry forests; Chiapas Depression dry forests; Sonoran-Sinaloan transition subtropical dry forest; Southern Pacific dry forests; Sinaloan dry forests; and Sierra de la Laguna dry forests.

The Jalisco dry forests are a region of large diversity in Mexico. Characteristic features of this forest are that the trees lose their leaves for a long period of time during the dry season and the forest is unusual in that it rarely burns. The Chiapas Depression is a dry forest valley in southern Mexico and western Guatemala. Variations in altitude results in diverse habitats for nearly 1,000 different dry adapted plant species.

== Cloud forests ==
Five environmental requirements seem to govern the presence of cloud forests in Mexico: high relative humidity, montane environments, irregular topography, deep litter layer and temperate climate.

Cloud forests are found in small areas of 20 states, at altitudes between 600 and 3,100 masl. It is estimated that they are composed of nearly 10% of the plant species in the country (about 2,500 species) of which 30% are unique to these forests. Of these, about 1,300 species are dicots, 700 are monocots, 500 are ferns and 10 are gymnosperms. There are also 800 epiphytes.

== Issues in forestry ==
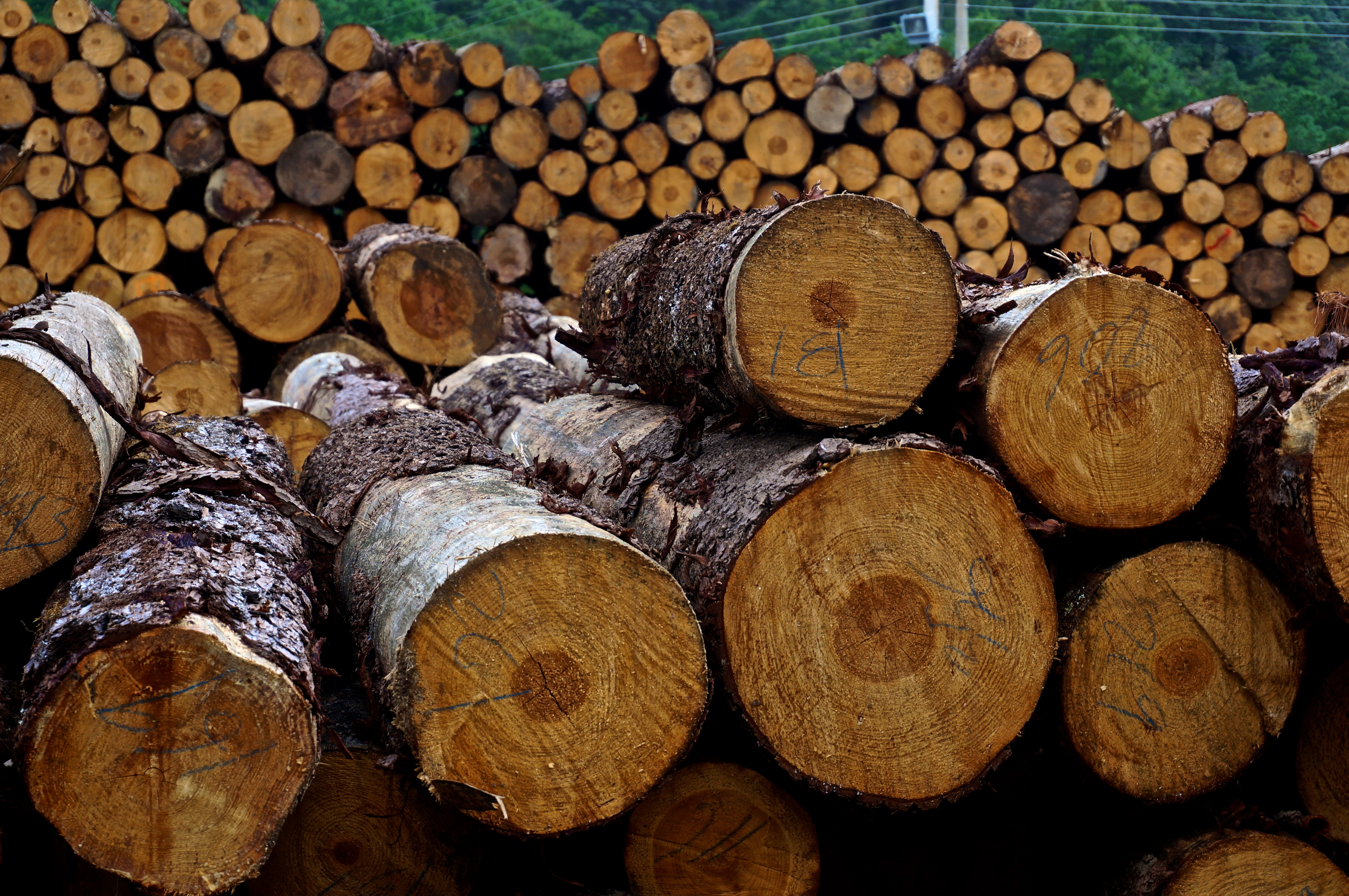
Logging in Oaxaca

The National Forestry Commission has taken an important role in managing Mexico's forests. Policy-makers have attempted to address deforestation in some areas by paying landowners (cash or non-cash) to conserve forests, upstream management of forests aimed at long term sustainability of downstream water. The Commission has fostered the expansion of such programs to allow matching funds for non-governmental organizations and municipalities. Since 1986, when the nation devolved ownership of forest resources to communities and ejidos, Mexico has become a world leader in community managed forests for the commercial production of timber. In 1992, community ownership of forests in Mexico was given constitutional protection when The Agrarian Law of 1992 amended the Mexican Constitution and gave ejidos and other indigenous land holders the right to lease their properties under certain circumstances. As of 2016, The Law for the Ecological Balance and the Protection of the Environment of 1998, is the General Law for Sustainable Forest Development of 2003 and its subsequent related amendments serve as the force of national forestry regulation in Mexico. The 2003 law assigns specific responsibilities to the competent authorities at local, regional and national levels, and seeks to regulate and promote the conservation, protection, restoration, production, organization, agricultural activity, and management of Mexico's forests in order to secure sustainable forest development. The Law for the Ecological Balance and the Protection of the Environment of 1998, which promotes the preservation and restoration of ecological balance and environmental protection in Mexico, also remains in force and addresses matters not covered by the later General Law for Sustainable Forest Development of 2003.

== Gallery ==
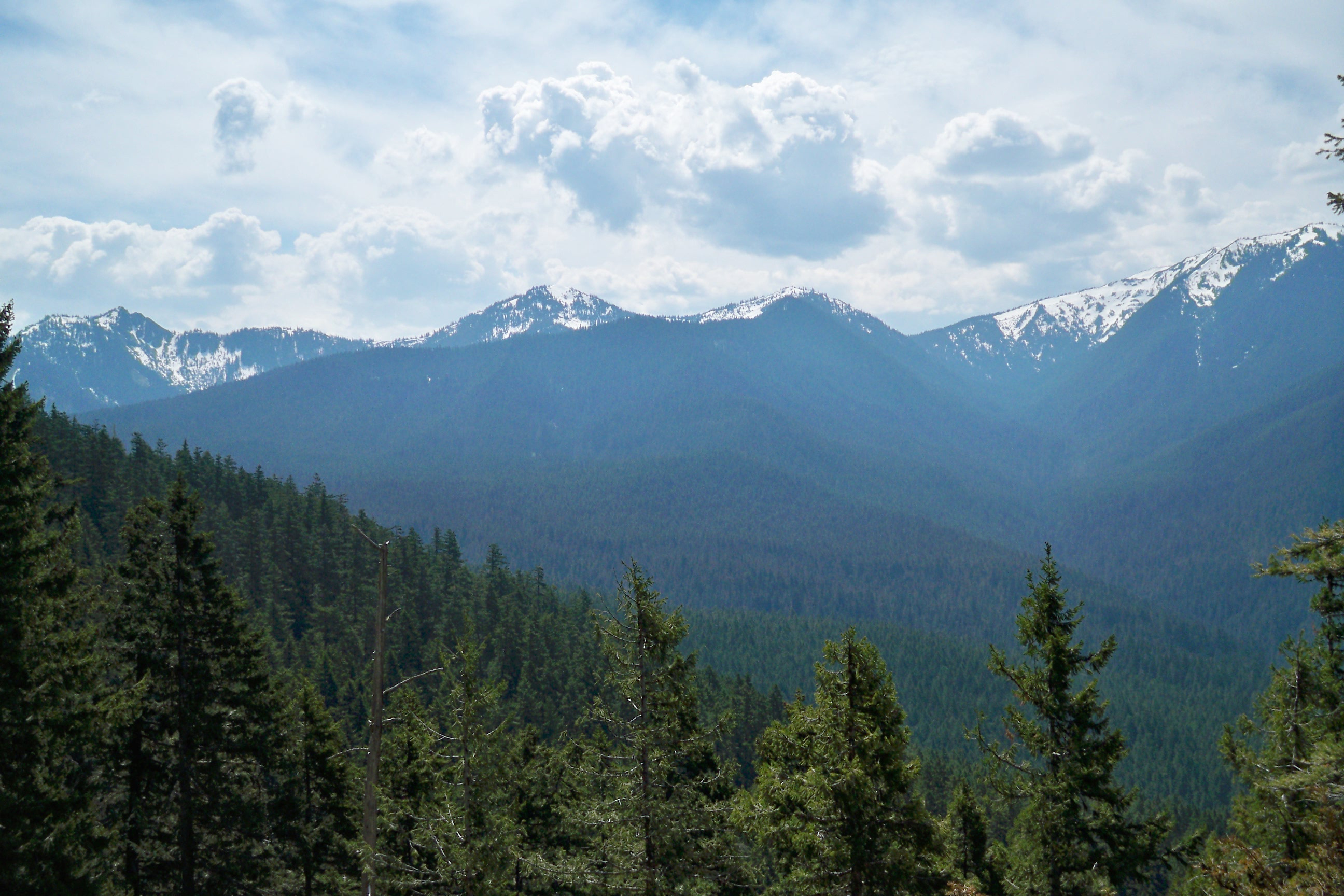
Cumbres del Ajusco National Park

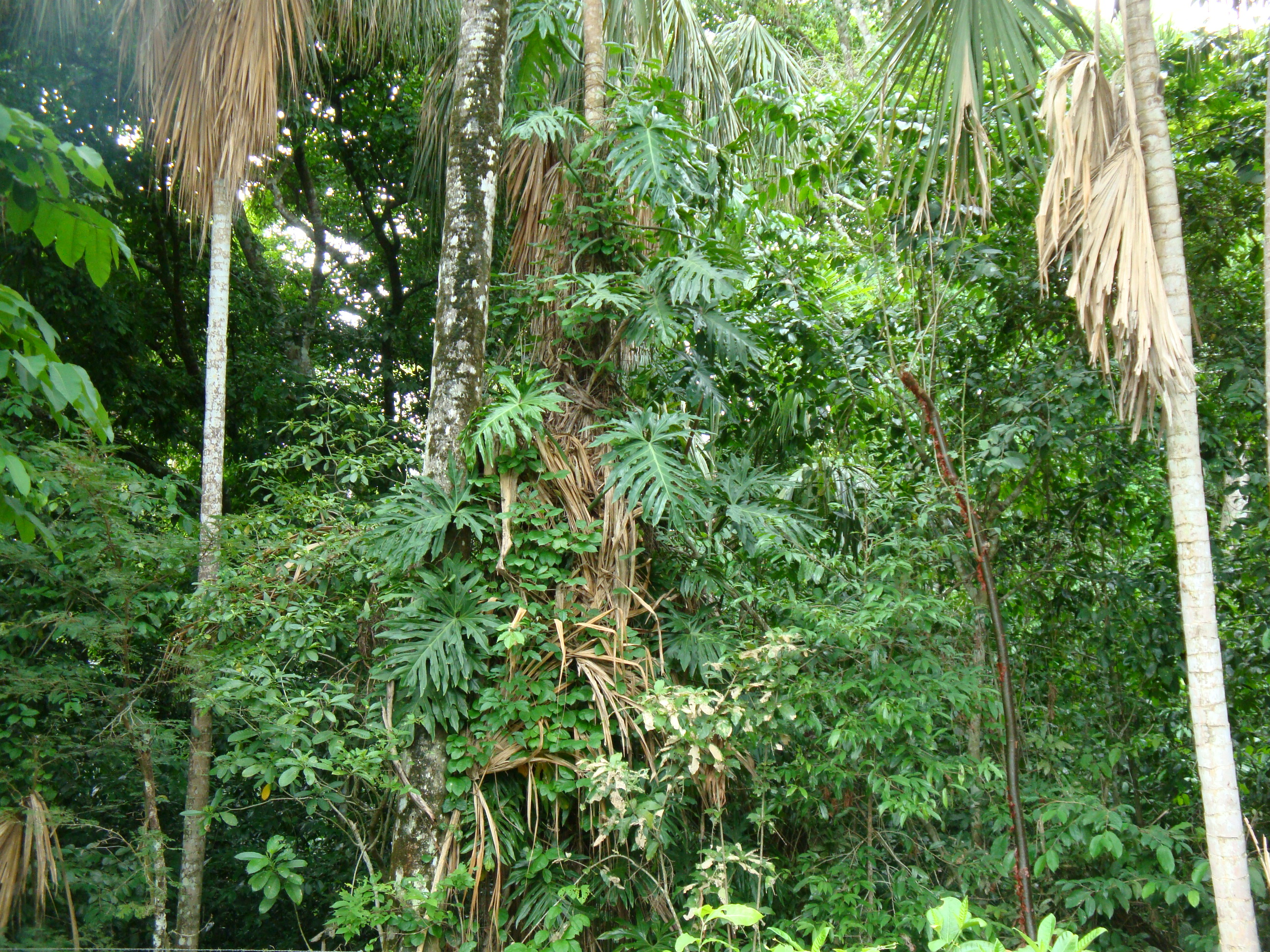
Tropical rainforest in Tabasco

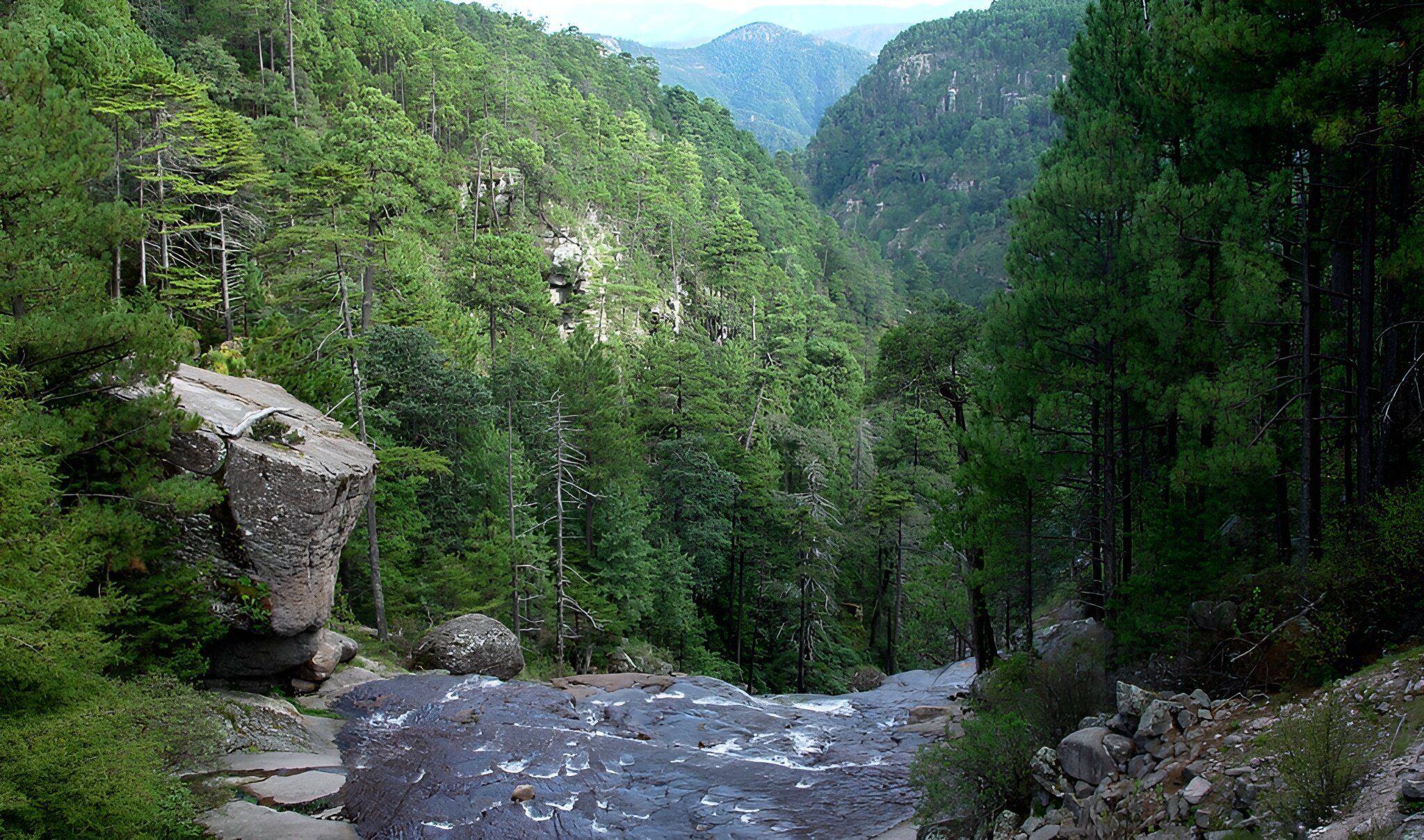
Mexiquillo in Durango.

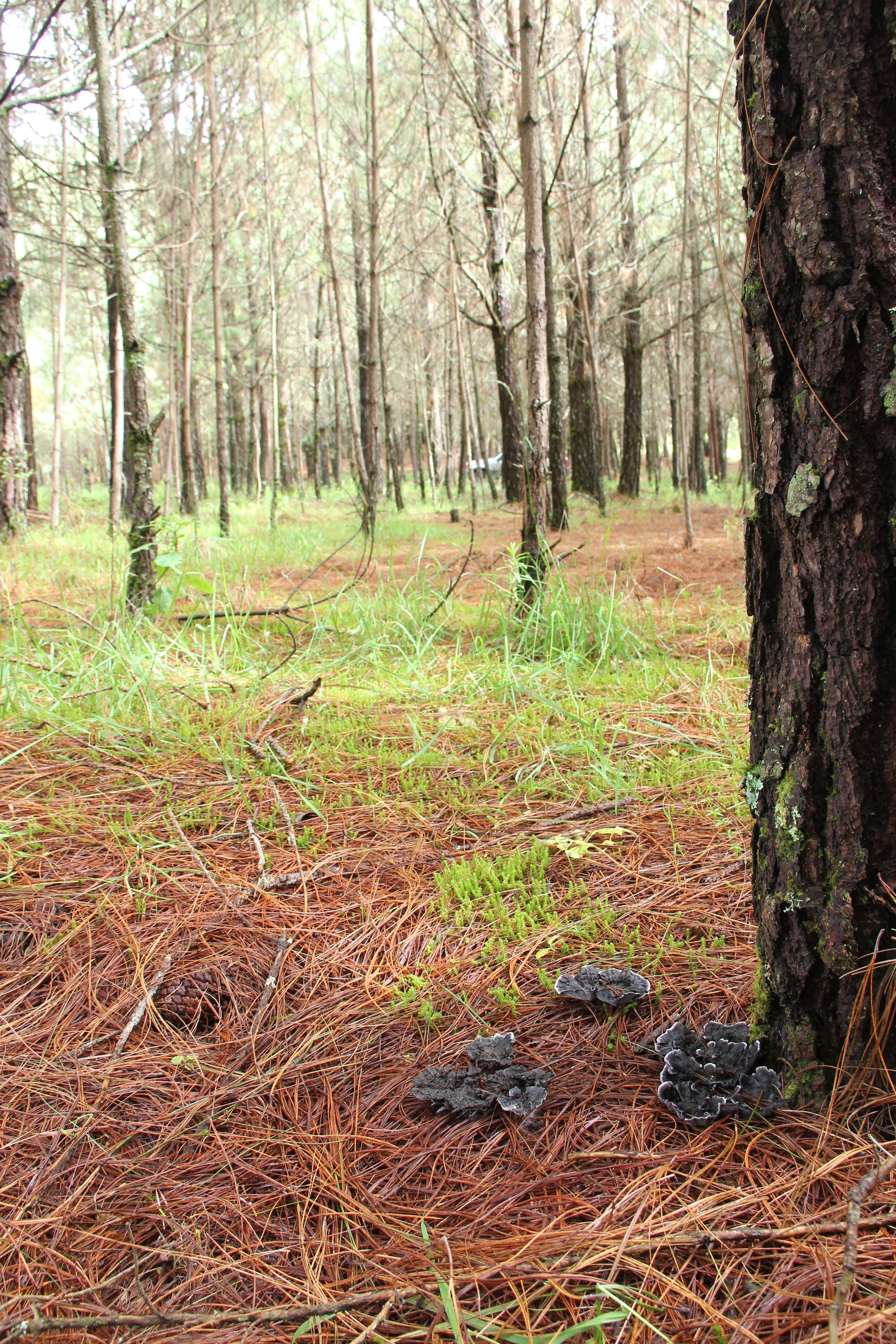
Pine forest at the Nevado de Toluca in the State of Mexico.

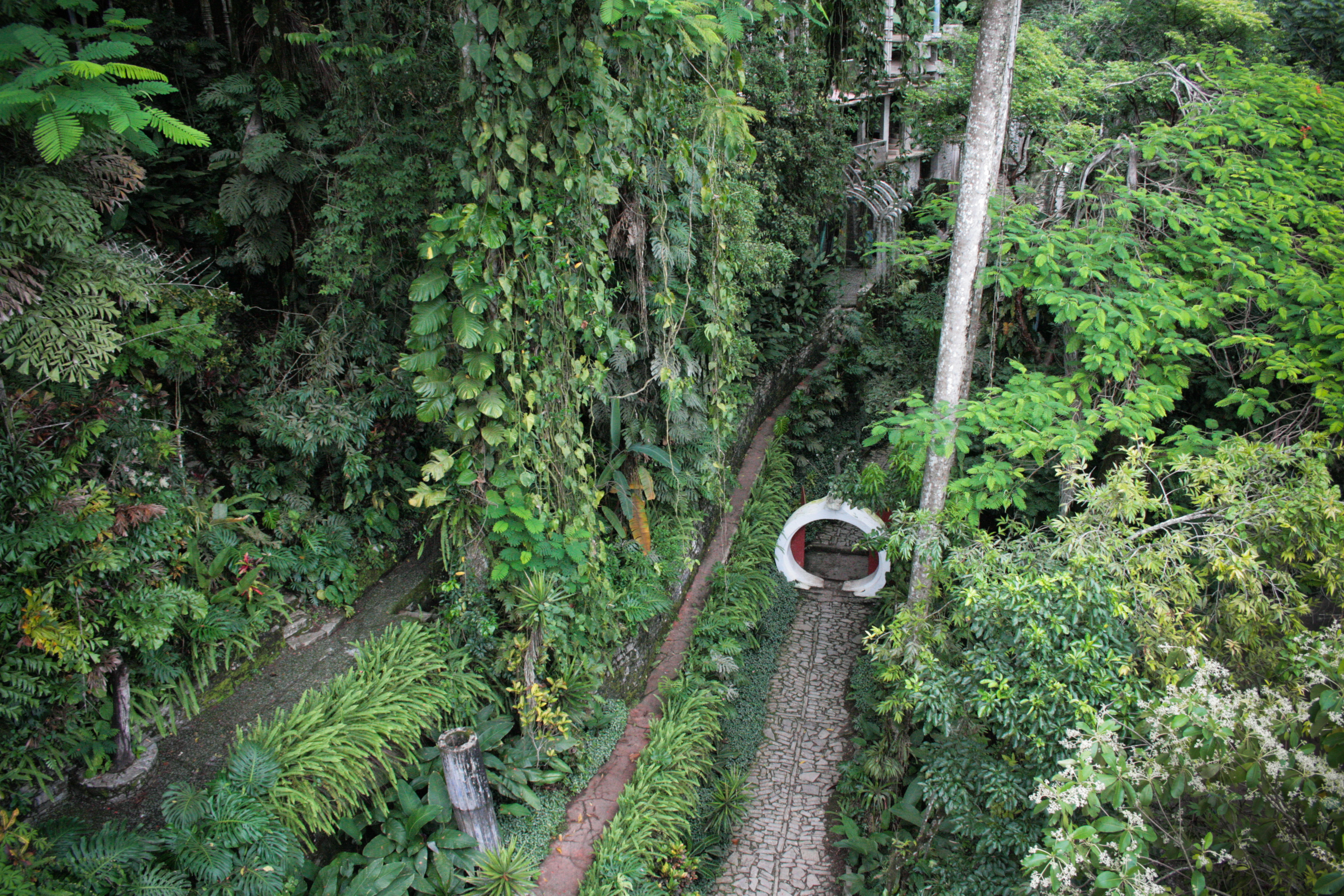
Las Pozas is located in a subtropical rainforest of San Luis Potosí.

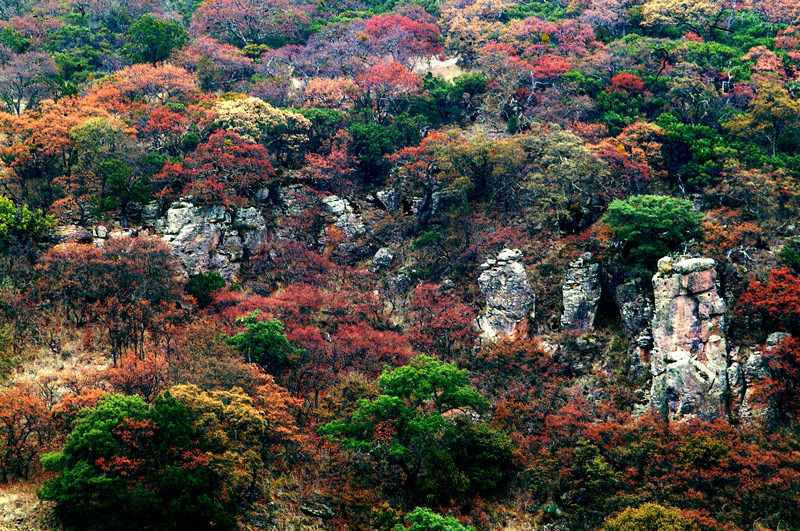
Autumn foliage in the Sierra Fría of Aguascalientes.

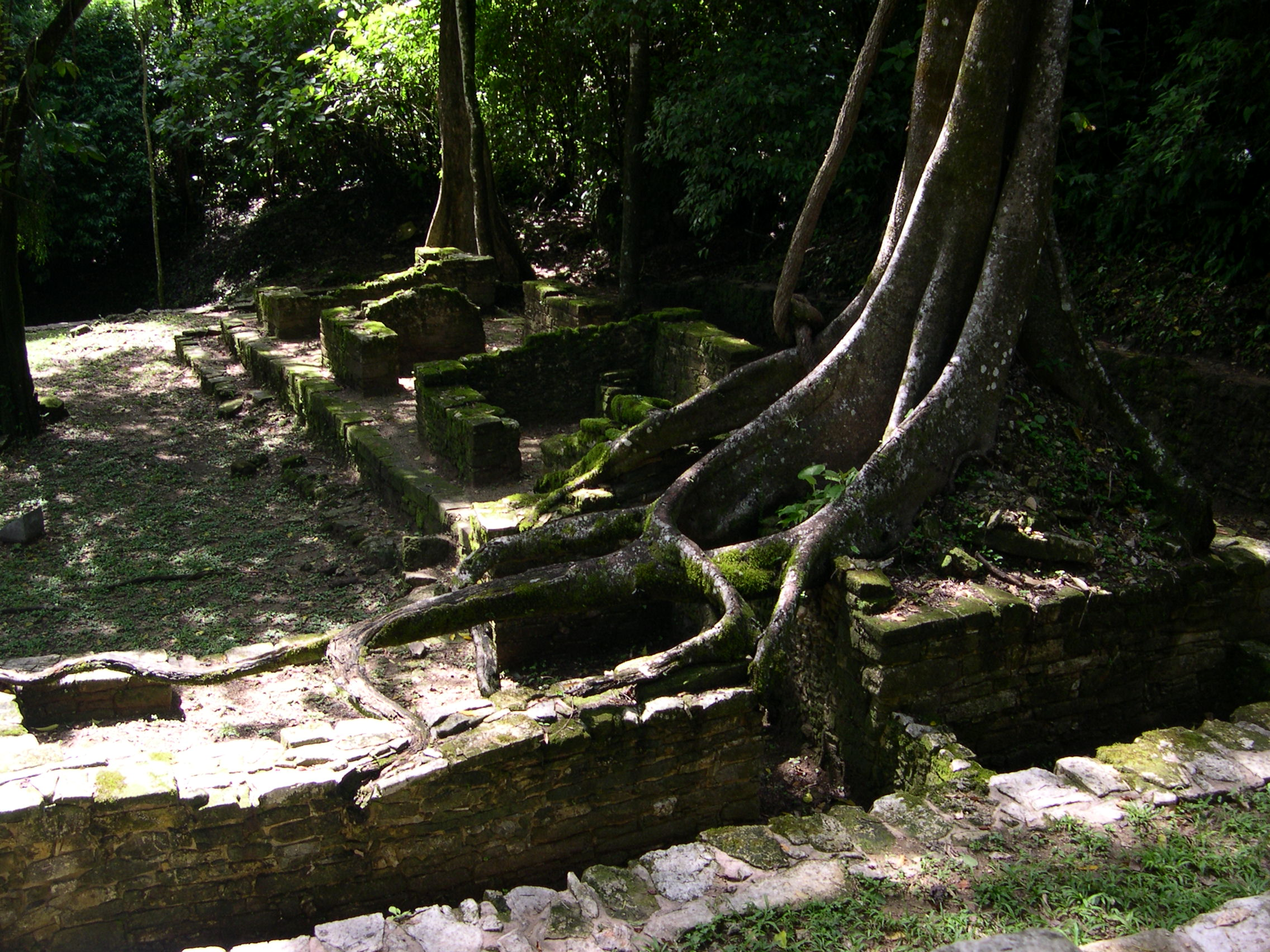
Ruins at Palenque enveloped by tropical rainforest vegetation

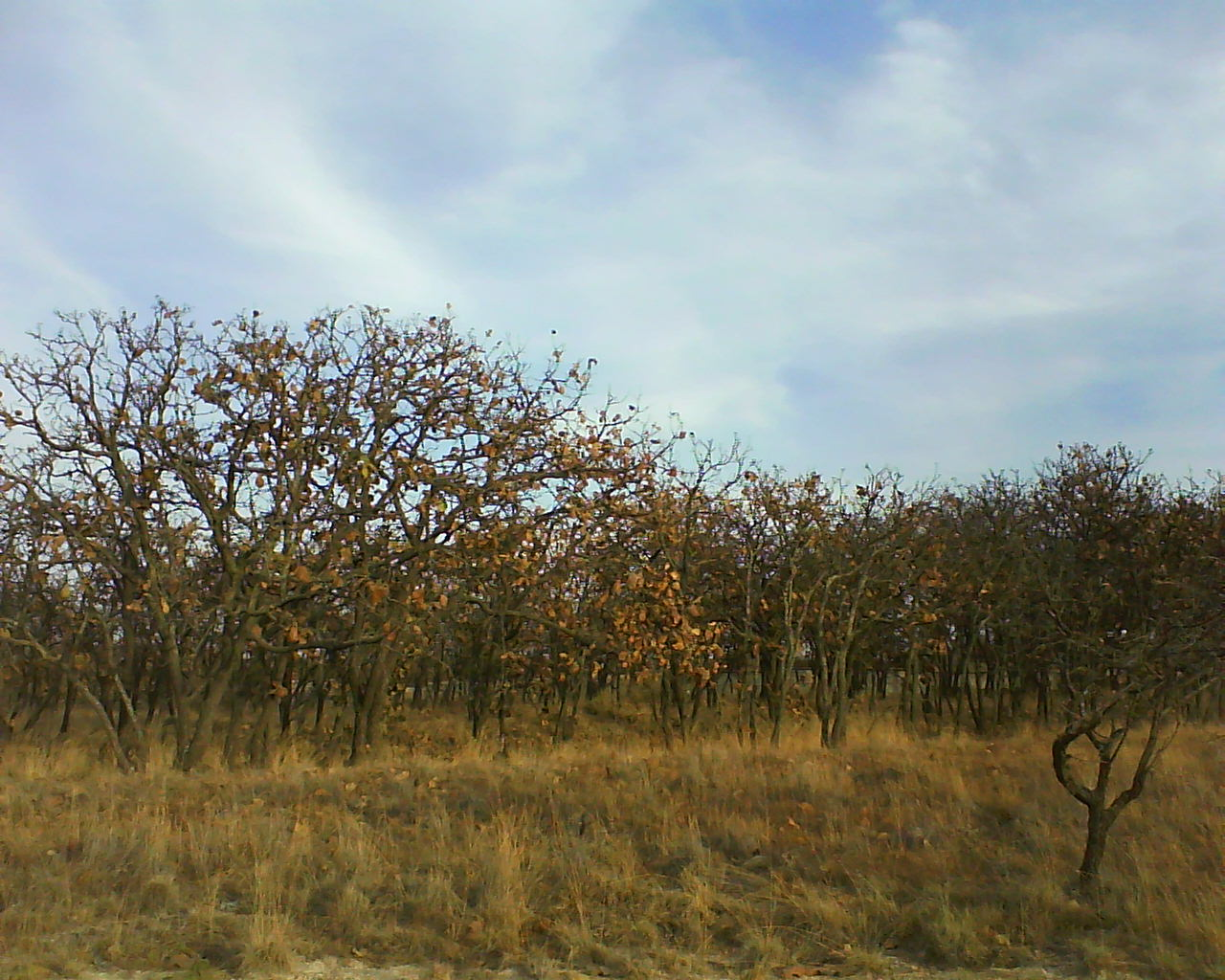
Bosque el Nixticuil in Jalisco

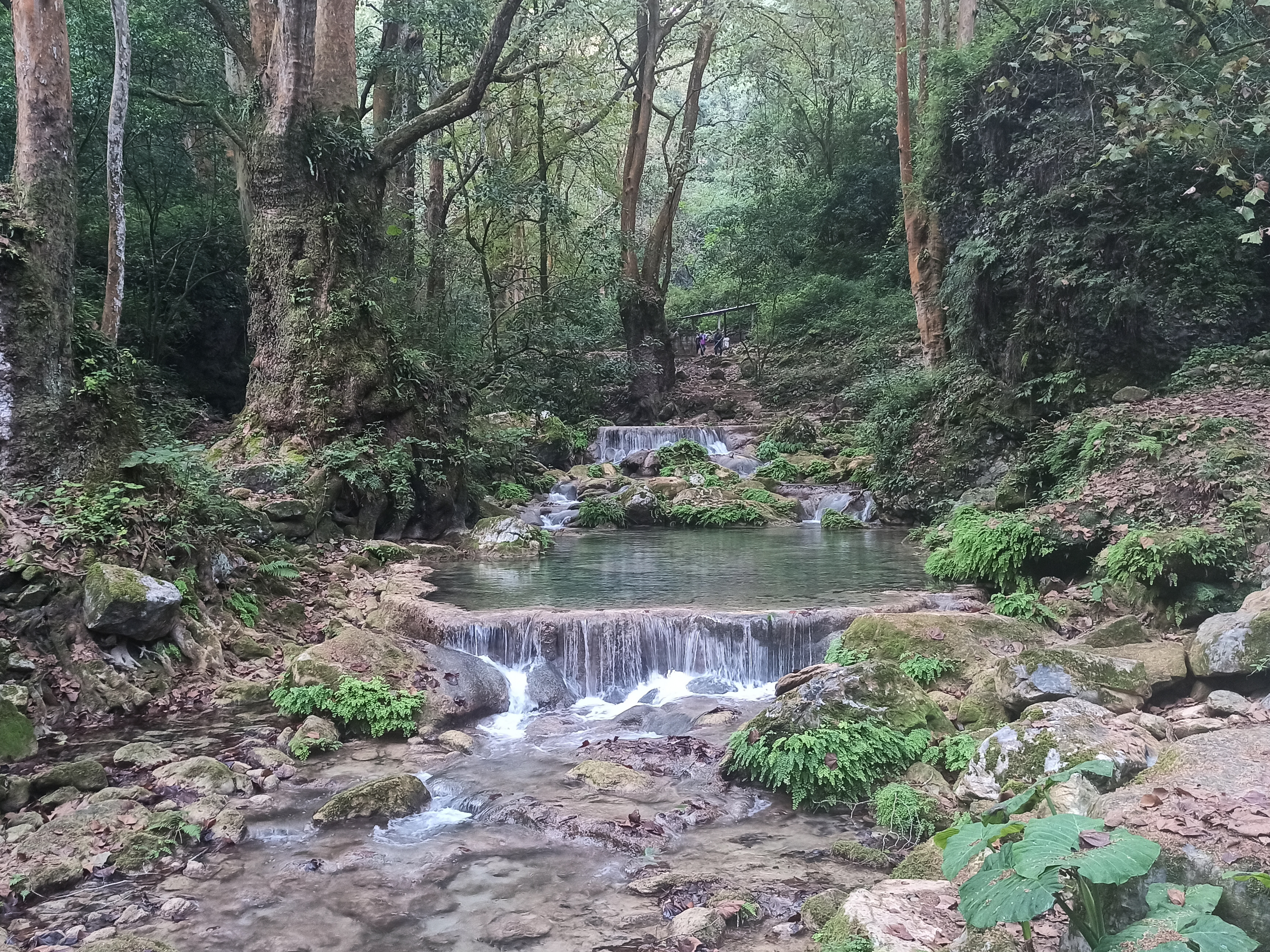
Forest in the Sierra Gorda Biosphere Reserve in Querétaro

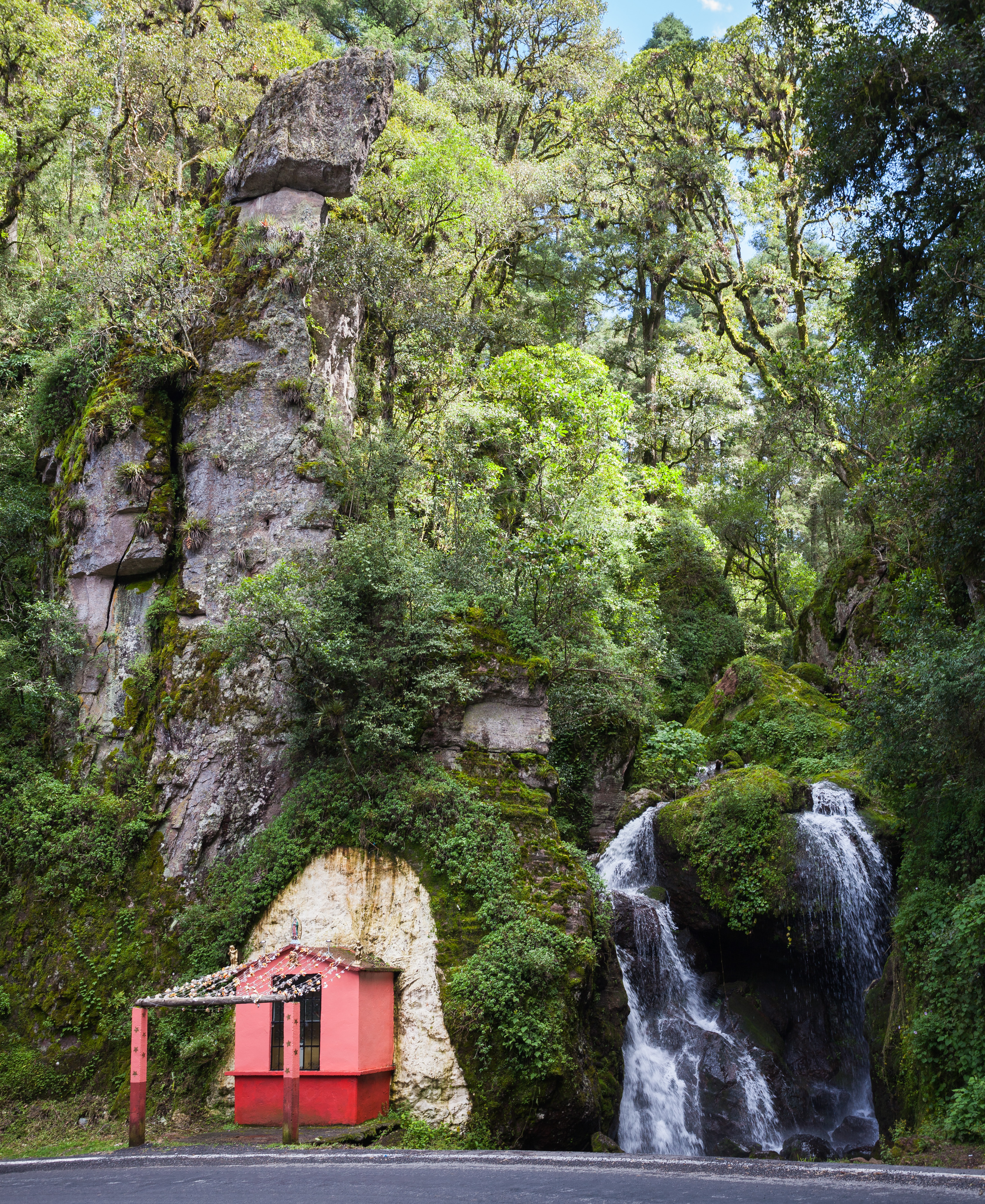
Forest growth near Mineral del Chico, Hidalgo

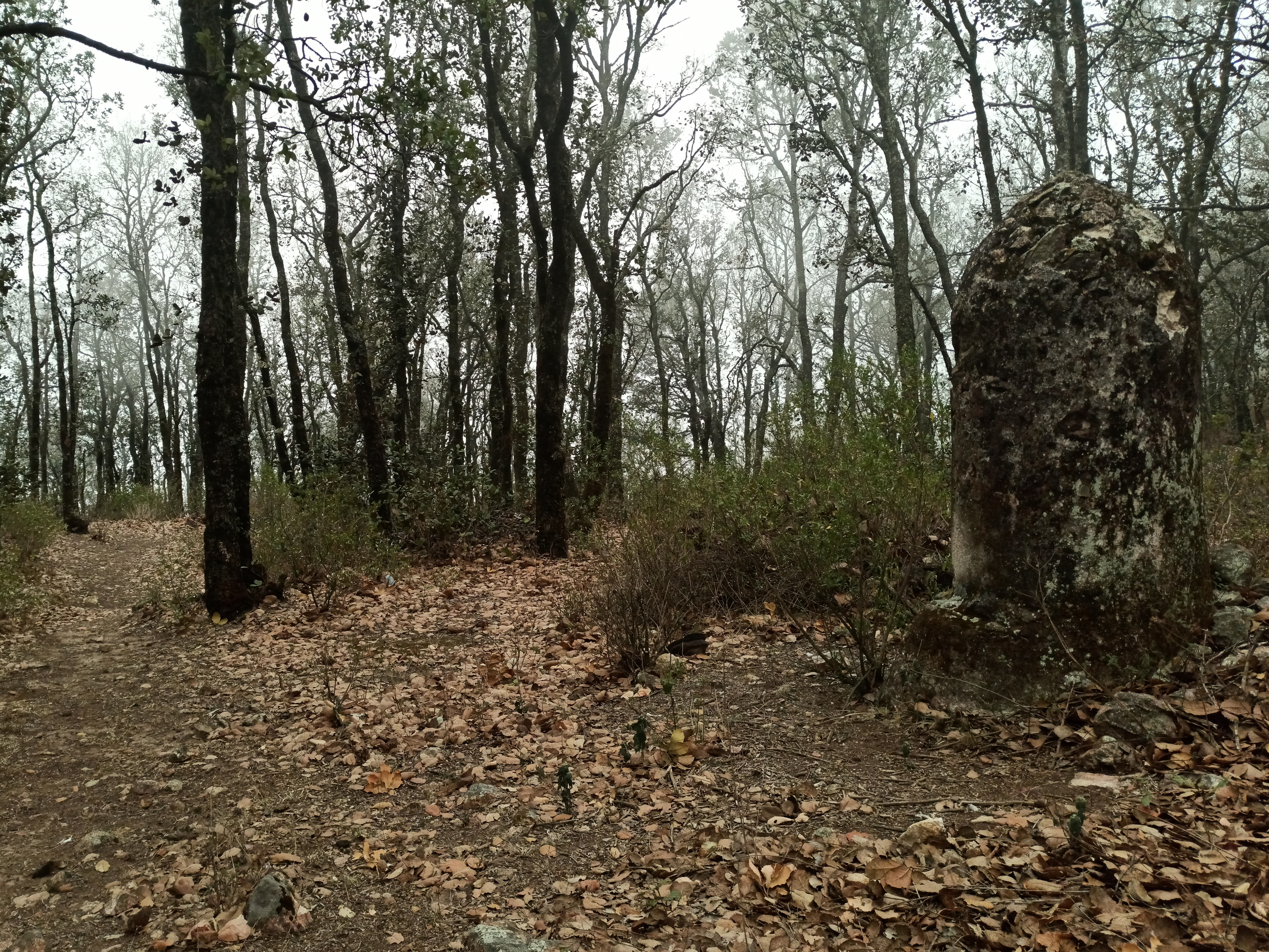
Oak forest in the Sierra de Santa Rosa in Guanajuato

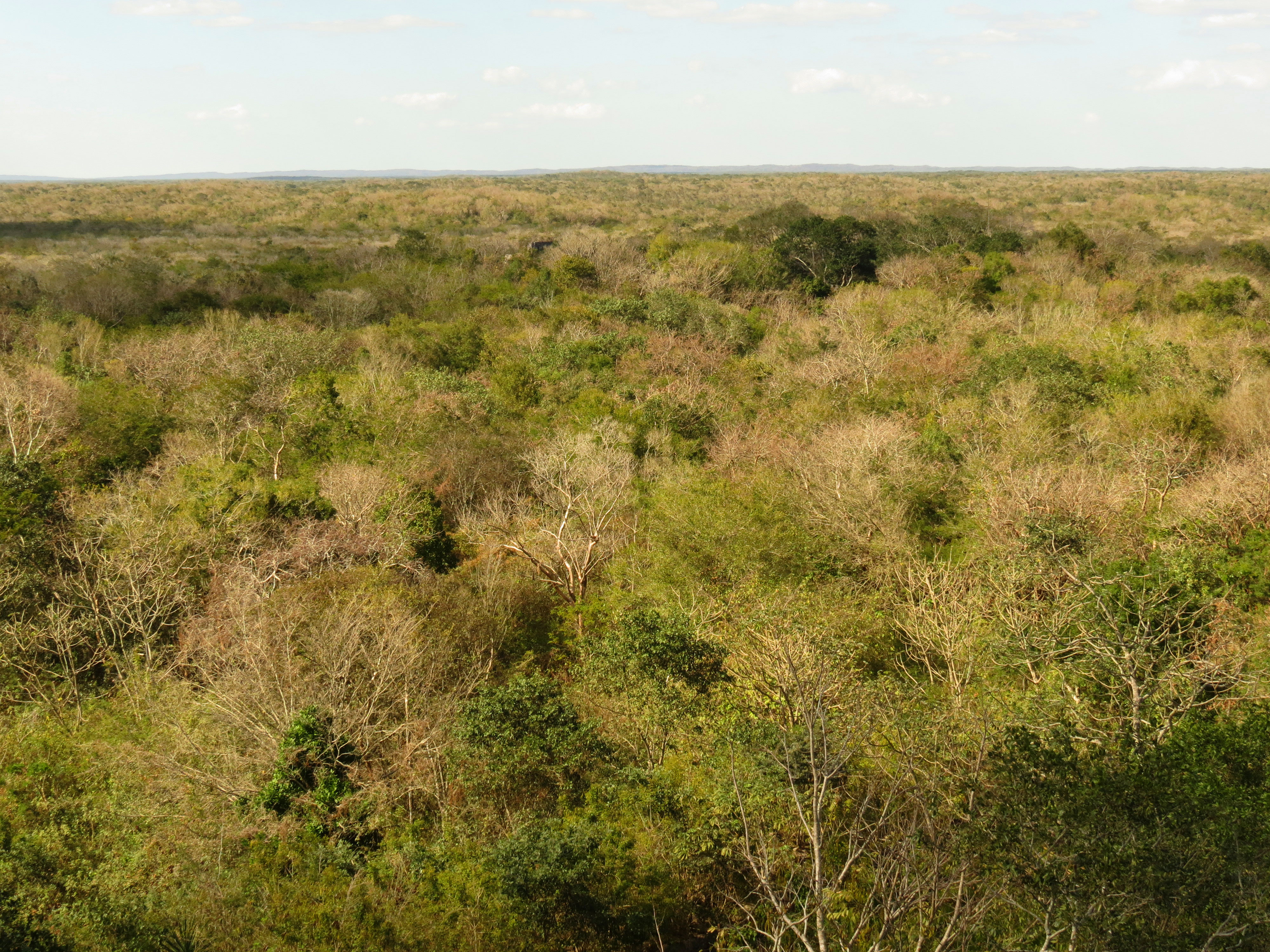
Uxmal is surrounded by a tropical deciduous forest, where trees shed leaves during the dry season

== See also ==
- Environmental history of Latin America
- Conifers of Mexico
- List of ecoregions in Mexico
