= Environmental history of Latin America =

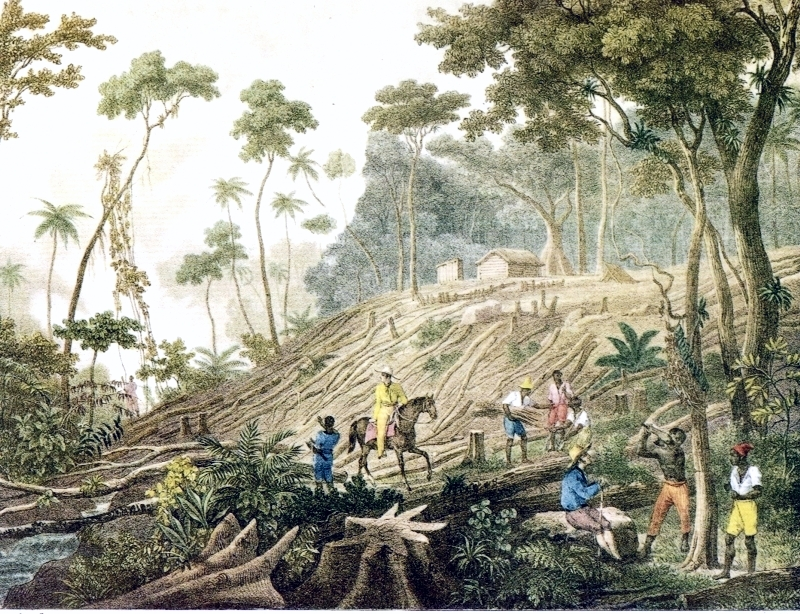
Slaves clearing the Brazil's Atlantic forest on behalf of the Portuguese settlers, c. 1820.

The environmental history of Latin America has become the focus of a number of scholars, starting in the later years of the twentieth century. But historians earlier than that recognized that the environment played a major role in the region's history. Environmental history more generally has developed as a specialized, yet broad and diverse field. According to one assessment of the field, scholars have mainly been concerned with "three categories of research: colonialism, capitalism, and conservation" and the analysis focuses on narratives of environmental decline. There are several currents within the field. One examines humans within particular ecosystems; another concerns humans’ cultural relationship with nature; and environmental politics and policy.

General topics that scholars examine are forestry and deforestation; rural landscapes, especially agro-export industries and ranching; conservation of the environment through protected zones, such as parks and preserves; water issues including irrigation, drought, flooding and its control through dams, urban water supply, use, and waste water. The field often classifies research by geographically, temporally, and thematically.

Much of the environmental history of Latin America focuses on the nineteenth and twentieth centuries, but there is a growing body of research on the first three centuries (1500-1800) of European impact. As the field established itself as a more defined academic pursuit, the journal Environmental History was founded in 1996, as a joint venture of the Forest History Society and the American Society for Environmental History (ASEH). The Latin American and Caribbean Society for Environmental History (SOLCHA) formed in 2004. Standard reference works for Latin American now include a section on environmental history.

== Early scholarship ==
Works by geographers and other scholars began focusing on humans and the environmental context, especially Carl O. Sauer at University of California, Berkeley. Other early scholars examining humans and nature interactions, such as William Denevan, Julian Steward, Eric Wolf, and Claude Lévi-Strauss. In terms of impact, however, Alfred W. Crosby's The Columbian Exchange (1972) was a major work, one of the first to deal with profound environmental changes touched off by European settlement in the New World. It examines a range of impacts of Europeans on Latin America, especially during the period of European Contact, including epidemic disease and the importation of Old World animals and plants and the development of large-scale ranching and agriculture.

Crosby further developed the argument in Ecological Imperialism (2004). Archeologists such as Richard MacNeish conducted fieldwork uncovering the origins of agriculture in Mesoamerica and in the Andes, giving a long timeline for the human-wrought changes in the environment before the arrival of the Europeans. William Denevan specifically argued against the "pristine myth" of lack of human impact on the environment prior to 1492.

== Indigenous land use before European contact ==
Environmental historians have been criticized for what is called “recentism,” that is examining twentieth-century environmental issues. Works by archeologists and historians focusing on the colonial era in Latin America (1492-1825), which were not called “environmental history” at the time, are a rejoinder to that criticism. Human activity shaped the environment of Latin America long before the arrival of Europeans in the late 1400s. In central Mexico and the highland Andes, settled indigenous civilizations were created because indigenous groups could produce agricultural surpluses of native carbohydrates, maize and potatoes. These surpluses allowed for social differentiation and hierarchy, large settlements with monumental architecture, and political states that could demand labor and tribute from growing populations. There was significant altering of the natural landscape in order to create more arable and productive land. Agriculture in Mesoamerica (the region of central and southern Mexico and Central America), was characterized by intensive agricultural methods to boost their food production and give them a competitive advantage over less skillful peoples. These intensive agricultural methods included canals, terracing, raised fields, ridged fields, chinampas, the use of human feces as fertilizer, seasonal swamps or bajos, using muck from the bajos to create fertile fields, dikes, dams, irrigation, water reservoirs, several types of water storage systems, hydraulic systems, swamp reclamation, swidden systems, and other agricultural techniques that have not yet been fully understood. Maize was the center of the indigenous diet.

Environmental factors are now considered crucial in the “collapse” when monumental architecture ceased to be erected in the southern Maya region. Deforestation was caused by human activity. Drought might have been a factor arising from the deforestation. By the time Spaniards began exploring Central America in the early sixteenth century, there were 600 years of jungle growth and only ruins of the monumental structures, but the human populations persisted in smaller numbers and scattered settlements, practicing subsistence agriculture. These decreased Maya populations proved more resistant to European conquest and consolidation than their conquest of the Aztec Empire.

The Maya people did not disappear, but adapted often more sustainably to nature. In the Andes, terracing of steep hillsides brought land into cultivation, with potatoes being the main source of carbohydrates. Llamas and alpacas were domesticated. While llamas could carry burdens of up to 50 kilos, they were not harnessed for agricultural work. Both were sources of dietary protein. In areas not suitable to sedentary agriculture, there were usually small bands of people, often extended kin groups, who pursued hunting and gathering on a gendered basis. There were no domesticated large animals suitable for domestication that could be used as beasts of burden or transportation. When the Spaniards introduced horses in desert and semiarid regions, they were acquired by many indigenous groups, transforming their ways of life.

== Environmental transformations, ca. 1500-1825 ==
Indigenous peoples had shaped the environment and utilized its resources, but Europeans even more significantly changed the environment with large-scale resource extraction, especially mining, as well as the transformation of agriculture to cultivation of crops to feed urban populations and the introduction of livestock, used for food, leather, wool, and tallow. Deforestation increased at a rapid pace and water resources were appropriated by Europeans.

=== Disease and demographic collapse ===
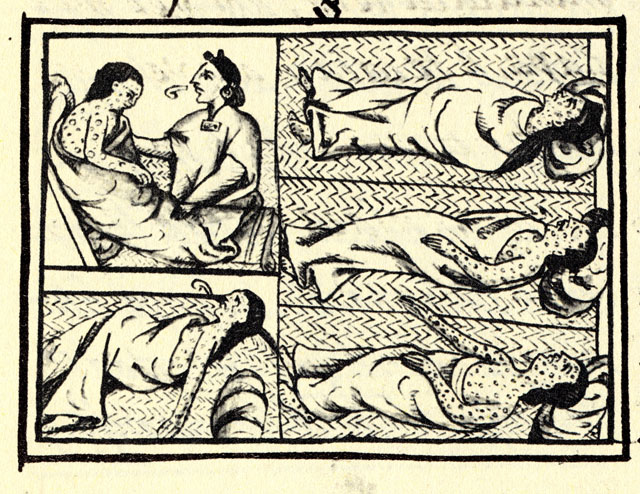
Indigenous Mexican depiction of smallpox during the Spanish conquest of the Aztec empire; it was one of the diseases that devastated populations with no resistance.

With the deliberate importation of Old World plants and animals and the unintentional spread of diseases brought by the Europeans (smallpox, measles, and others) changed the natural environment in many parts of Latin America. European diseases devastated indigenous populations. The demographic catastrophe of natives on islands first settled by the Europeans prompted their exploration of others in the Caribbean and slave raiding, with consequences for the overall demography of the Caribbean. Then as Europeans explored and settled further, the demographic catastrophe was further replicated in the sixteenth century.

Recently, scientists have been considering whether the population loss had an impact on carbon dioxide levels, which might well have led to the "Little Ice Age."

=== Commodities and the environment in the early colonial era ===
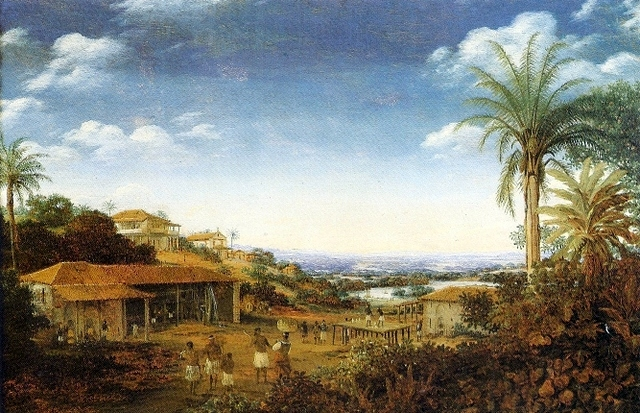
Sugar complex ("engenho") in colonial Brazil. Frans Post.

Placer mining of gold in the Caribbean did not have a major impact on the natural environment, but it did have a devastating impact on the indigenous populations. Europeans sought indigenous labor for placer mining to the exclusion of other activities, including tending crops. The Europeans initiated slave raiding elsewhere in the Caribbean. Venezuela and the islands of Cubagua and Margarita Island was found to have rich deposits of pearl oysters. Natives of the region had long harvested them, and traded them with Europeans. The Europeans’ demand for pearls increased and the careful and selective indigenous methods gave way to Spaniards’ wholesale destruction of the oyster beds with dredges. The Spanish crown intervened to try to prevent further destruction, banning dredges and attempting to keep the oyster fisheries sustainable. Unknown to them was the environmental conditions that pearl oysters needed for produce their treasure – proper salinity and temperature of the water and the optimal type of sea bottom. But the unsophisticated harvesting of pearls clearly destroyed the oyster beds’ sustainability.

The search for a high value export product also resulted in Spaniards introducing cane sugar cultivation and the importation of African slaves as the main labor force. African slaves were forcibly brought in the early the 1500s and sugar plantations were established on the island of Hispaniola (now divided between Haiti and the Dominican Republic). The Spanish and Portuguese had established sugar plantations in the Atlantic islands off the African coast, in Madeira, São Tomé, and the Canary Islands. Cane sugar cultivation often necessitated clearing land, but more destructive to forests was the need for wood to fuel the boiling down of cane juice to form moist, but solid sugar suitable for shipping. The cutting of trees was initiated on the island of Hispaniola and later other islands as well. Deforestation had an environmental impact with the expansion of sugar cultivation. Not only were trees felled and areas burned to create fields, but the woodlands beyond the fields were the source for wood for processing raw cane juice into refined sugar that could be exported. Since sugar cane must be processed immediately upon its cutting, the sugar refineries (Portuguese:engenhos, Spanish: trapiches or ingenios) had to be located close to the fields, since cane juice leaked out of cut cane almost immediately. The exhaustion of soils and destruction of forests was not sustainable, but Europeans saw land as being an abundant resource, and therefore not worth conserving. In the Caribbean islands, the limits of wide spread deforestation and soil exhaustion were obvious. Many did not take the long view, since Europeans often moved to what they hoped were more promising regions. This happened in the early Caribbean once the Europeans conquered Aztec and Inca empires. Cane sugar became the main export product from Portuguese Brazil and on Caribbean islands that other European powers seized from Spain.

=== Silver mining and mercury ===
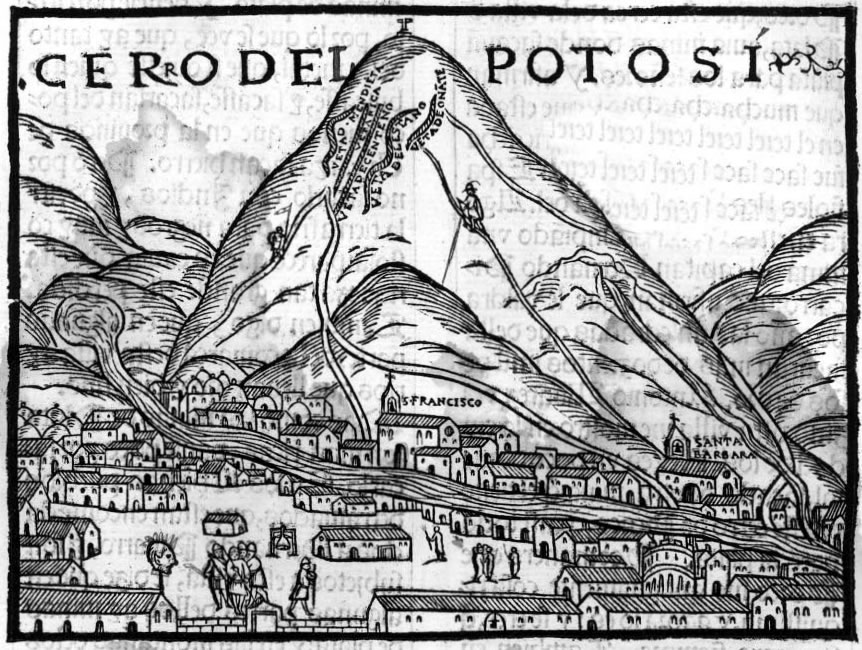
Cerro Rico del Potosi, the first image of silver mountain in the Europe. Pedro Cieza de León, 1553.

The hopes that Europeans had of finding easily exploitable sources of precious metals were dashed in the Spanish occupation in the Caribbean. Placer gold mining using forced indigenous labor did yield relatively small amounts of gold and did not have a huge deleterious environmental impact to the landscape, but the cost to the indigenous populations was considerable. Overwork contributed to their rapid demise.

Starting in the 1540s, silver became the major precious metal exploited by Spanish mining entrepreneurs under crown license. There were several mining sites in northern New Spain, particularly Guanajuato and Zacatecas, both outside the zone of dense indigenous settlement. In the highland Andes, there a single mountain, the Cerro Rico, in Potosí, Upper Peru (now Bolivia) was rich with veins of silver. In both Mexico and Peru, deep shaft mining required large numbers of laborers, but the footprint on the environment was not primarily caused by the mines themselves. Processing the pure silver from silver ore required considerable environmental costs.

Around mining sites, there was massive deforestation, since early processing was by heating ore separating out molten silver. The early silver boom ended, in good part because the fuel to process the ore was exhausted through deforestation. In both Mexico and Peru, the introduction of mercury amalgam to process ore resulted in the revival of mining and more insidious and long-term environmental impacts.

Mercury mined in Almadén, Spain and shipped to Mexico in leather bags and transported to mining sites by mule. Like silver, mercury was a crown monopoly, so that the crown expected to reap maximum wealth from this resource. Costs of mining, transatlantic transportation, and the overland transport added to the costs to mining entrepreneurs. High costs for mercury often resulted in the abandonment of mining sites, since it had an impact on profitability. In the eighteenth century, the Spanish crown calculated that lowering the cost of mercury to miners in Mexico would result in higher silver output. The respite of the environment of Northern Mexico from mercury poisoning ended and the eighteenth century saw a boom in silver production.

In Peru, there was a local source of mercury, the Huancavelica mine, making production costs cheaper, but with a far higher cost to the human and natural environment in the region. The toxicity of mercury was known at the time, although the science of it was not. When mercury was discovered in significant amounts at Huancavelica, Peru's silver mining industry could regain its previous levels of output. Forced indigenous labor was directed toward mining mercury, which the indigenous rightly considered a death sentence. Spanish officials also knew the impact on human populations, but did not modify their forced labor policies, since they rightly identified mercury as the key to continued silver production and wealth of the Spanish Empire.

The environmental degradation was significant. Deep shaft mining of mercury put miners in direct contact with the element and they were its first victims. However, since the mercury was volatilized in silver ore processing and only partially recaptured, its impact on larger human and animal populations was more widespread since it can be absorbed by breathing. Mercury made its way in to the watershed as well, poisoning water supplies. The toxic impact results in nerve damage, inducing muscle deterioration and mental disorders, infertility, birth defects, asthma, and chronic fatigue, to name just a few. Huancavelica produced approximately 68,000 metric tons of mercury, which went into the air and water of Potosí.

=== Water issues ===
==== Ethnic conflicts ====
As European populations increased in areas with existing indigenous settlement and agriculture, conflicts over access to water increased. In colonial Puebla, Mexico, European elites increasingly appropriated water indigenous communities needed for their agriculture, with deleterious results to those communities.

==== Urban flooding ====
In general, the presence or absence of sufficient water was a major determinant of where human settlement would occur in the pre-industrial Latin America. Large-scale irrigation projects were not undertaken in the colonial era. However, the major hydraulic project to drain the central lake system in the Basin of Mexico, known as the Desagüe, was undertaken to try to control flooding in the vice-regal capital of Mexico City. Tens of thousands of indigenous men were compelled to work on the project, which diverted their labor from agricultural enterprises. Although the project absorbed massive amounts of forced human labor, it was not until the late nineteenth century when the drainage project was completed.

==== Aqueducts ====
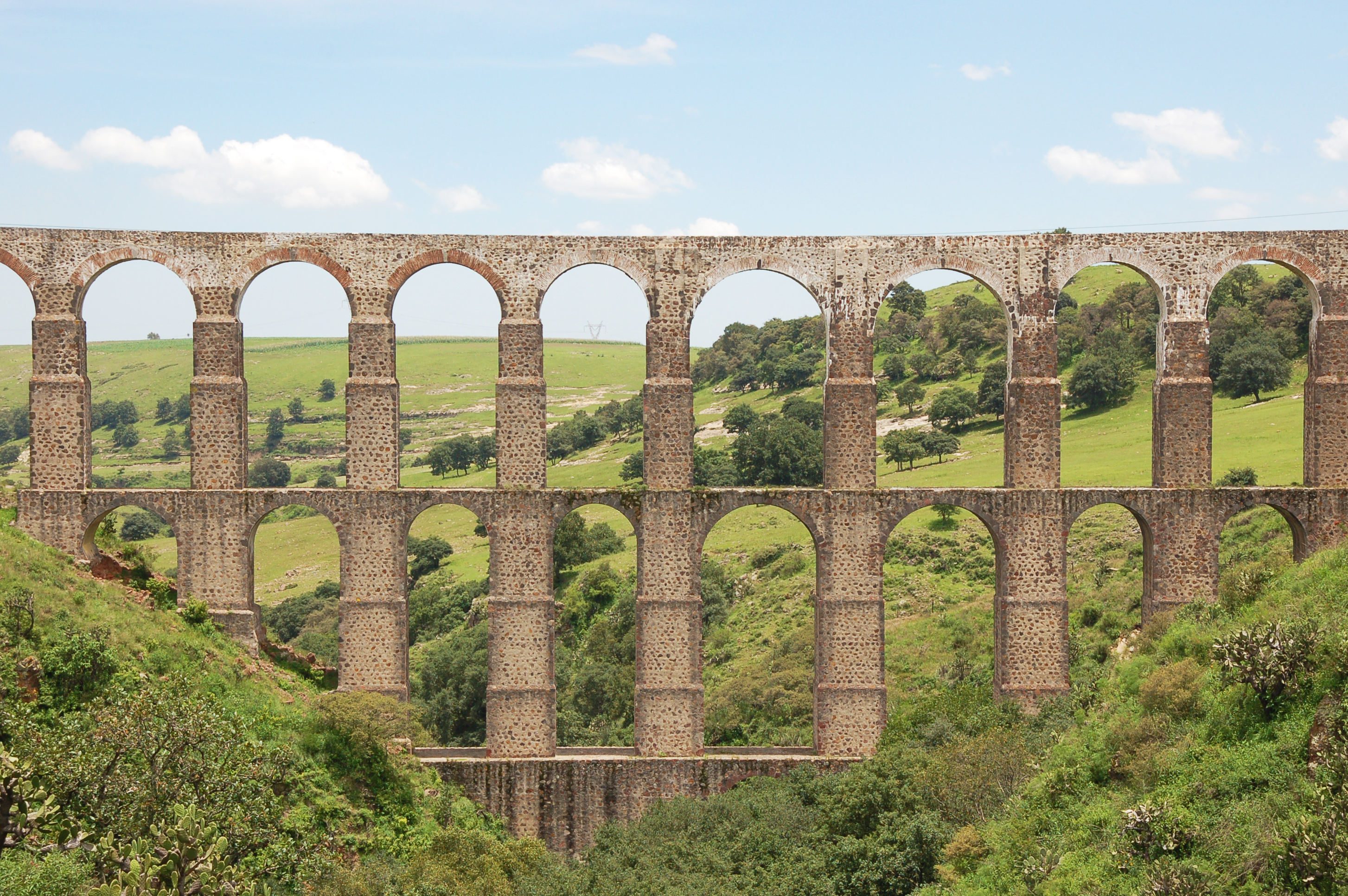
Aqueduct of los Arcos, near Tepotzotlán, Mexico (18th c.)

Aqueducts were constructed to supply urban centers with drinking water. Before the Spanish conquest in 1521, the Aztecs had constructed an aqueduct from a spring at Chapultepec (“hill of the grasshopper”) to Tenochitlan to provide freshwater to the urban population of nearly 100,000. It had dual pipes so that maintenance of the aqueduct would not cut off the Aztec capital's water supply. The aqueduct was constructed using wood, carved stone, and compacted soil, with portions made of hollowed logs, allowing canoes to travel underneath. During the Spanish conquest of the Aztec Empire, Hernán Cortés realized the importance of the Chapultepec aqueduct to the Aztecs and cut the water supply to Tenochtitlan. In the colonial period, the Chapultepec aqueduct continued to function, with 904 arches and an open air path for drinking water. In the late nineteenth century, there were major public hydraulic works undertaken to create a network of piped fresh water to Mexico City, since scientific ideas had identified water as a vector for disease. Shortly after the Spanish conquest, the aqueduct of Acámbaro was constructed in Guanajuato.

The Zacatecas aqueduct was constructed to supply drinking water to the major mining center. A Roman-style aqueduct of Queretaro was completed in 1738 to provide drinking water to the provincial capital of Querétaro. It was privately funded by Don Juan Antonio de Urrutia y Arana, Marques de la Villa del Villar del Aguila. It functioned into the twentieth century to supply drinking water to the city and continues to supply water to the city's water fountains. Other colonial-era aqueducts are the Morelia aqueduct; the Saucillo aqueduct in Huichapan, Hidalgo state; the Chihuahua aqueduct; the Guadalupe aqueduct in the Villa de Guadalupe, in northern Mexico City; another constructed near the capital was the Santa Fe aqueduct; and also the Tepozotlan aqueduct. Although many aqueducts were built in the colonial era, there have been no studies of their impact on their local watersheds.

=== Agriculture and ranching ===
Much of the environmental literature on the post-1492 expansion of agriculture and ranching of cattle and sheep falls into the category of environmental degradation or destruction, what environmental scholars call “declension.” An early study of the introduction of sheep into Mexico found that the environmental impact of sheep grazing in colonial Mexico is the subject of a study of the Mezquital Valley, which went from a thriving area of traditional peasant agriculture to one devoted sheep grazing. Sheep were one of the animals introduced to Spanish America with important consequences for the environment. Since sheep graze vegetation to the ground, plants often do not grow back. Wool was a major economic resource for the domestic cloth market in Mexico, so sheep ranching expanded during the colonial era, in many cases leaving ecological destruction. Antedating Melville's study on a particular place in colonial Mexico is a study by the transfer of cattle and sheep to New Spain, as well as a subsequent study. Research by Ligia Herrera in Panama indicates that tropical rainforest transformed into pastures from 1950 to 1990 exceeded the total amount lost from 1500-1950.

=== Spanish crown and conservation ===
The Spanish crown was concerned with conservation of resources it deemed vital, asserting right of eminent domain over territory it conquered On the island of Cuba, the crown attempted to regulate the cutting of trees needed for ship building and repairs, especially masts. Although sugar was a valuable and expanding agro-export crop, the crown kept its expansion in check for much of the colonial era because of deforestation.

In colonial Mexico, the crown set up an official body, the Council of Forests, to conserve them from destruction from unregulated cutting. The main fuel in the colonial era was wood, often transformed to charcoal. There was an increasing demand from mining regions as well as cities and towns, so that as trees were cut down entirely rather than cut allowing them to regrow, forest resources further from these sites were vulnerable to deforestation. The crown saw deforestation as a threat to silver mining, the motor of the empire's economy, so that establishing regulations was a matter for the state.

== Commodity boom and environmental impact, 1825-present ==
With Spanish American and Brazilian independence from Spain and Portugal in the early nineteenth century, independent nation-states initiated a new era of resource utilization, which transformed Latin America, a "second conquest." The Spanish Empire and the Portuguese Empire had kept other powers at bay, but now many new sovereign states sought financial benefit from private enterprise, foreign and domestic, in exploiting the environment.

=== Nitrates ===
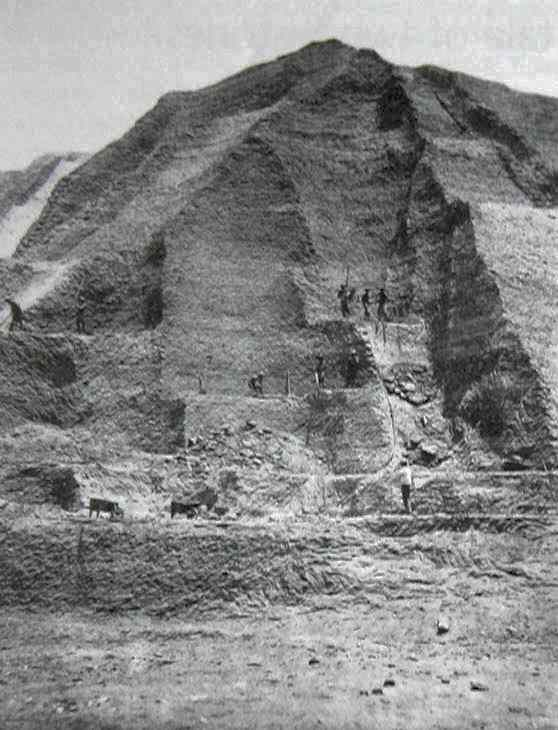
Mining guano in the Chincha Islands off the central coast of Peru c. 1860.

For Peru, huge deposits of bird guano on the Chincha islands off its coast provided revenue for the Peruvian state, facilitating its post-independence consolidation. Guano was a valuable commodity, which prompted Peruvian government monopoly control. Rich in nitrates for fertilizer and saltpeter for gunpowder, guano was mined and shipped directly from the mine sites. The deposits were huge, accumulated from bird droppings over a long time period. The local environmental impact is difficult to assess, since the islands were not occupied by humans.

To exploit this valuable resource was easy, since it only required shovels and conscript labor. Once humans started mining the guano, the birds could not produce enough guano to replenish it, so it was not a sustainable export industry. Spain sought to regain control over this valuable commodity in their former empire, fomenting the Chincha Islands War. Chile sought nitrate deposits outside its own territory, and declared war on Peru and Bolivia, the War of the Pacific.

=== Sugar and deforestation ===
Europeans had overseen the development of cane sugar cultivation since the 1520s, using African slave labor. Demand for sugar continued to climb. Brazil's coastal forests were systematically destroyed to expand the amount of land for sugar cultivation. Warren Dean's 1997 book With Broadax and Firebrand: The Destruction of the Brazilian Atlantic Forest was written as an environmental history of Brazil. Expansion of sugar cultivation on the island of Cuba followed the Haitian Revolution, which saw the destruction of sugar plantations of France's former colony of Saint-Domingue on Hispaniola. Cuban sugar cultivation on a massive scale saw crown protection of forests give way from pressure of sugar planters.

=== Coffee ===
As Brazil lost market share of sugar production, it expanded into another agro-export product, coffee. Coffee grows best on uplands, so that deforestation in Brazil proceeded there. There were multiple sites of coffee cultivation in Brazil, in the Paraiba River Valley; São Paulo Colombia also became a major coffee producer. Coffee in Costa Rica could not easily reach European markets, since the country's main port was on the Pacific coast. The Costa Rican government contracted with Minor Cooper Keith to build a railway to the Gulf Coast port of Limón. Keith turned land he got in compensation for building the railway to banana cultivation, which became the country's major industry. The prerequisite for both industries was clearing of forests to make way for plantation agriculture.

=== Rubber ===
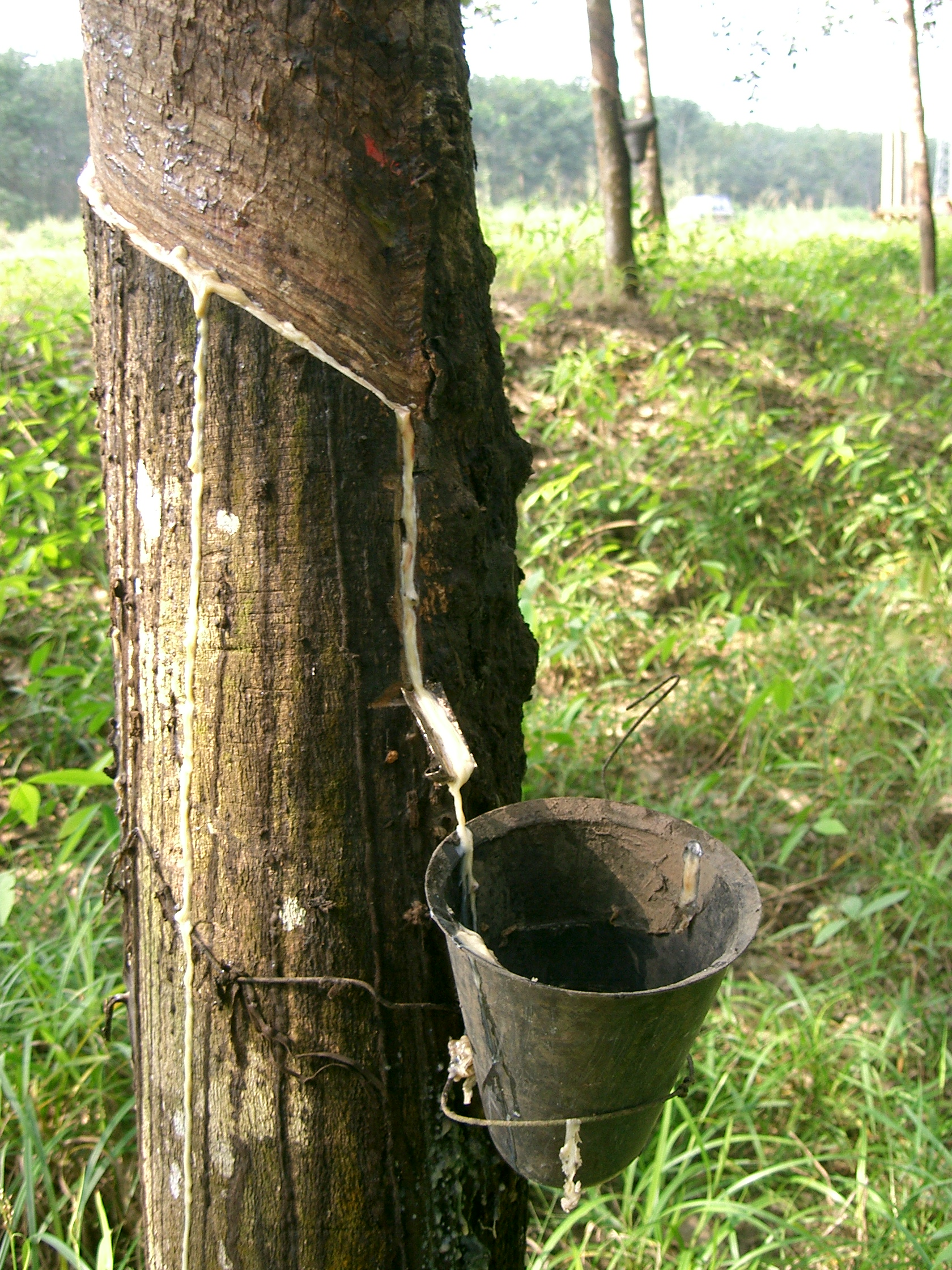
Latex being collected from a tapped.

Trees (Hevea brasiliensis) producing natural latex grew wild in Amazonia, but rubber did not become a major export product until industrialization created a demand for rubber tires for vehicles. Starting around 1850, trees growing in the wild were tapped for their rubber in a highly exploitative form of labor. Trees were deliberately cut and the latex sap was collected in buckets tended regularly by poorly paid laborers. Although exploitative of labor, the industry was a form of resource extraction that did not result in deforestation or destruction of the trees, which could tolerate the latex tapping. The maintenance of the forest was required to keep the industry viable.

It did produce wealth in Brazil for those who controlled the industry, with territories with trees divided into private domains, (seringais). Exploitation of the jungle had previously stayed close to rivers, but the rubber trees inland gave owners incentives to penetrate further. A major industry developed that linked wild trees, to exploited labor, to owners of tracts of land, to local commercial agents, to Brazilian companies dealing in trade with foreign companies, to international shipping companies.

Brazil was eventually displaced as the world's major source of rubber following the 1876 theft by a Briton, Henry Wickham, who smuggled 70,000 Amazonian rubber tree seeds from Brazil and delivered them to the royal botanical gardens at Kew, England. Some 2,500 germinated and were then sent to British colonies in India, British Ceylon (Sri Lanka), and British Malaya, among others, where extensive plantations were established. Malaya (now Peninsular Malaysia) was later to become the biggest producer of rubber. Brazil's rubber boom came to an end, but the conservation of the forests that kept the industry viable meant that Brazil's Amazonian rain forest kept its original density until deforestation was initiated in the 1970s.

=== Bananas ===
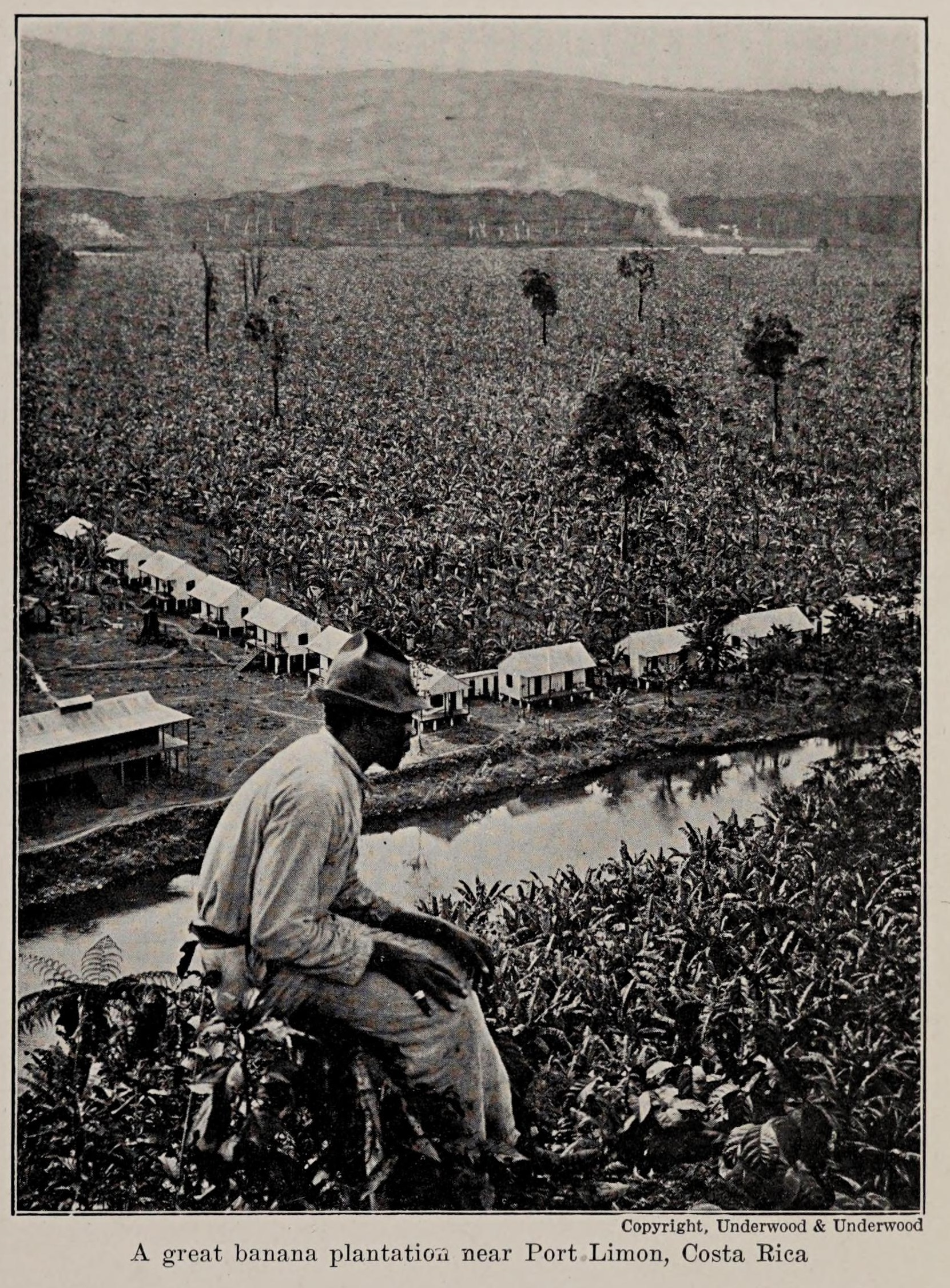
Banana plantation near Port Limón, Costa Rica.

Bananas are a tropical plant that has become a major export crop from tropical regions of Central and South America at the end of the nineteenth century. Bananas are relatively easy to grow in the tropics where there is sufficient water, but it could not become a major export crop until it could be brought to market quickly and sold cheaply to consumers. It first developed as an industry at the end of the nineteenth century in Costa Rica by American entrepreneur Minor Cooper Keith. Keith was contracted by the Costa Rican government to build a railway to the Gulf Coast port of Costa Rica so that the country's main export crop at the time, coffee, could more quickly reach Europe, its main market. The east coast of Costa Rica was thickly forested, so that building a railway was not easy. Keith received land along the railway in partial compensation, which when cleared he turned into extensive banana cultivation of the Gros Michel (“Big Mike”) (Musa acuminate) variety in monoculture.

The railway transported green bananas to the coast, which were loaded onto refrigerated ships he owned, and upon the bananas’ offloading in New Orleans, the railway network used refrigerated railway cars to distribute the bananas to local grocery stores. Disaster struck the industry with the outbreak of Panama disease, a fungus affecting banana plants that was resistant to fungicides. Banana plantations were abandoned in areas affected by the fungus, and new areas brought under cultivation once tropical jungles were destroyed.

=== Cattle ranching ===
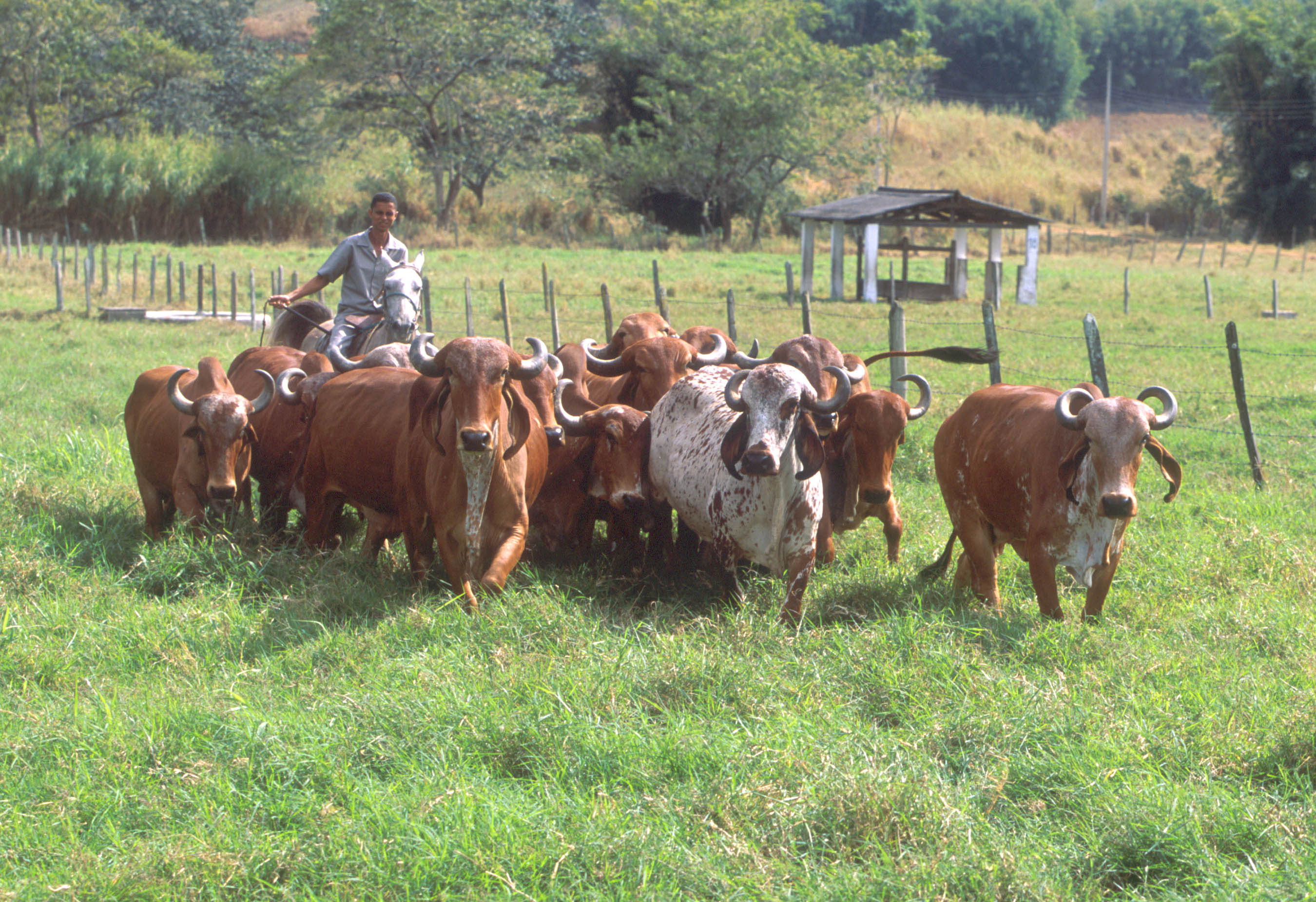
Gyr cattle, a type of zebu, prized for its tolerance for health and disease resistance.

Brazil expanded and transformed cattle ranching, starting at the turn of the twentieth century. Traditional cattle ranching counted on extensive pasturage and few human interventions, so that cattle were feral and bred without animal husbandry. The importation from South Asia of zebu, a resilient cattle breed suited for the tropics, was a significant investment, not just for the animals themselves, but for the development of a managed cattle industry in a part of Minas Gerais.

== See also ==
- Agroecology in Latin America
- Forests of Mexico
- Deforestation in Brazil
- Latin American economy
- List of environmental issues
