= Agroecology in Latin America =

Agroecological practices in Latin America

Agroecology is an applied science that involves the adaptation of ecological concepts to the structure, performance, and management of sustainable agroecosystems. In Latin America, agroecological practices have a long history and vary between regions but share three main approaches or levels: plot scale, farm scale, and food system scale. Agroecology in Latin American countries can be used as a tool for providing both ecological, economic, and social benefits to the communities that practice it, as well as maintaining high biodiversity and providing refuges for flora and fauna in these countries. Due to its broad scope and versatility, it is often referred to as "a science, a movement, a practice."

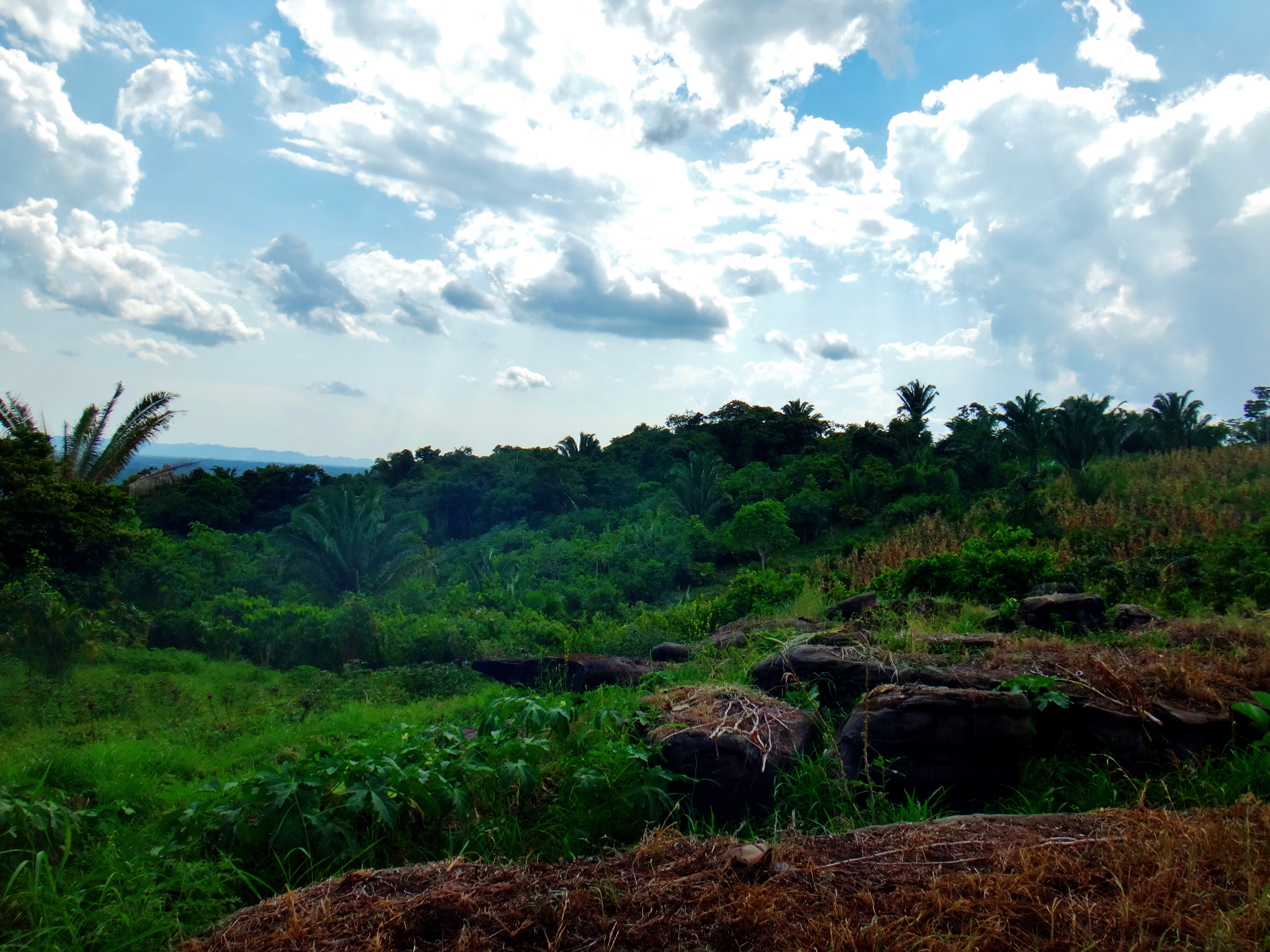
Overlooking a large shade cacao plantation where the Ixcacao Mayan Belizean Chocolate company grows and produces chocolate using Mayan techniques.

== Background ==
=== History ===
Agroecological methods have been practiced in Latin America for centuries, but the term agroecology in reference to the combination of agronomy and ecology was coined in 1928 by B.M. Bensin in the U.S. Until the 1960s, it mainly focused on the scientific aspects of agronomy and ecology and remained relatively unknown. However, due to the increasing awareness of the harmful effects of pesticides and the burgeoning environmental movement in the 1970s, agroecology gained momentum globally and began to integrate a much wider range of issues on top of ecological ones, such as the social, political, economic implications of agroecosystems. In this context, the scientific aspect of agroecology began to engage in dialogue with traditional local farming practices and experimentation in many regions. The relationship between agronomists and traditional practitioners, often subsistence farmers, has been termed an "exchange of wisdoms." Latin America's agroecological movement should be set against the historical backdrop of colonial exploitation, social inequities, and ecological challenges. During colonialism, land ownership and land use were restructured, with export crops replacing local food needs. Postcolonial government policies, in an effort to modernize agriculture, further entrenched these disparities and continued the export-orientation of food production. The newly independent governments of South America were often capitalist regimes, established by the United States; these governments continued colonial policies and regimes, in the name of integrating their economies into the ‘global markets’. This continued the dependent and exploitative relationship between state and farmers/farm workers, while harming local ecosystems as well. In Latin America specifically, agroecology spread more widely during the period of structural adjustment policies in the 1970s. In this time, many Latin American countries took up loans from the International Monetary Fund with strict conditions of trade liberalization that allowed large transnational corporations to grab large swaths of land and out-compete local markets. While many small farmers were negatively impacted, many others had joined to form cooperatives, social movements, or global organizations.

In Latin America specifically, agroecology spread more widely during the period of structural adjustment policies in the 1970s. In this time, many Latin American countries took up loans from the International Monetary Fund with strict conditions of trade liberalization that allowed large transnational corporations to grab large swaths of land and out-compete local markets. While many small farmers were negatively impacted, many others have joined to form cooperatives, social movements, or global organizations.

Since the 1970s, agroecology has been deeply entwined with Latin America's social movements, which have often framed agroecology as a form of resistance against neoliberal agricultural policies. These movements have fostered a uniquely Latin American form of agroecology, marked by its grassroots nature and emphasis on food sovereignty. This version of agroecology challenged the prevailing industrial agricultural model by promoting practices that are ecologically sustainable, socially just, and integrate indigenous knowledge systems. Latin American agroecology differs from other regional approaches in its focus on decolonization, anti-patriarchal values, and autonomy for farmers and indigenous groups. Some key features of Latin American Agroecology are: emphasizes critical engagement with political and social issues; integrates local and indigenous knowledge systems; promotes a dialogue of knowledge ("diálogo de saberes"); and, is closely associated with social movements and resistance against neoliberal agricultural policies.

== Benefits ==
Traditional farming systems of Latin America were forged from a need to subsist on limited means. These techniques were developed from centuries of cultural and biological evolution by combining experiences and methods of other peasant farmers using locally available resources. Due to its origins Latin American, agroecology represents a low impact form of agriculture. Modern agriculture had become a process of "artificialization of nature" producing a monoculture of a very few crop species. Agroecology contrasts industrial agriculture in its use of polyculture, lack of synthetic fertilizers, minimal machinery and incorporation of successional stages. Agroecology attempts to benefit both people and the environment by maximizing crop yield, but also preserving the natural environment. It is often practiced by forming agroecosystems which are communities of plants and animals interacting with their physical and chemical environment that have been planted and harvested by people.

=== Economic benefits ===
Agroecological principles allow farmers to save many in several important ways: becoming independent from large corporations' inputs such as GMO seeds and fertilizers; having a more diversified and thus more resilient crop system where income does not depend on one single crop; using simple, cost-effective techniques to increase productivity; having solidarity markets with local communities and thus a steady source of income; having a democratized method of knowledge and seed exchange.

Specific examples of economically successful agroecological systems include stabilizing hillside farming in Honduras. World Neighbors, an NGO, partnered with Honduran farmers to implement a program that helped practice soil conservation using techniques such as drainage and contour ditches, grass barriers, rock walls, and organic fertilization (e.g., use of chicken manure and intercropping with legumes). These changes allowed for an increase in grain yield of three to four times more than in previous years as well as supplied 1,200 families with grain.

Another example, from the Andean region in Peru where a partnership of NGOs and locals lead to the implementation of a Pre-Columbian indigenous technique called Waru Warus. This technique involved raising the fields and surrounding them with dug out ditches filled with water, which regulates the soil temperature allowing for an extended growing season. In the district of Huatta, this method of using waru-warus have increased annual potato yields by 4-10 metric tons per hectare.

A final example from the Andean region where some peasant communities in Cajamarca and NGOs planted more than 550,000 trees and reconstructed terraces as well as drainage and infiltration canals. This change allowed for about half the population in the area - 1,247 families - to have land under conservation measures. For these people, potato yields have increased from 5 to 8 tons per hectare and oca (wood sorrel) yields have jumped from 3 to 8 tons per hectare.

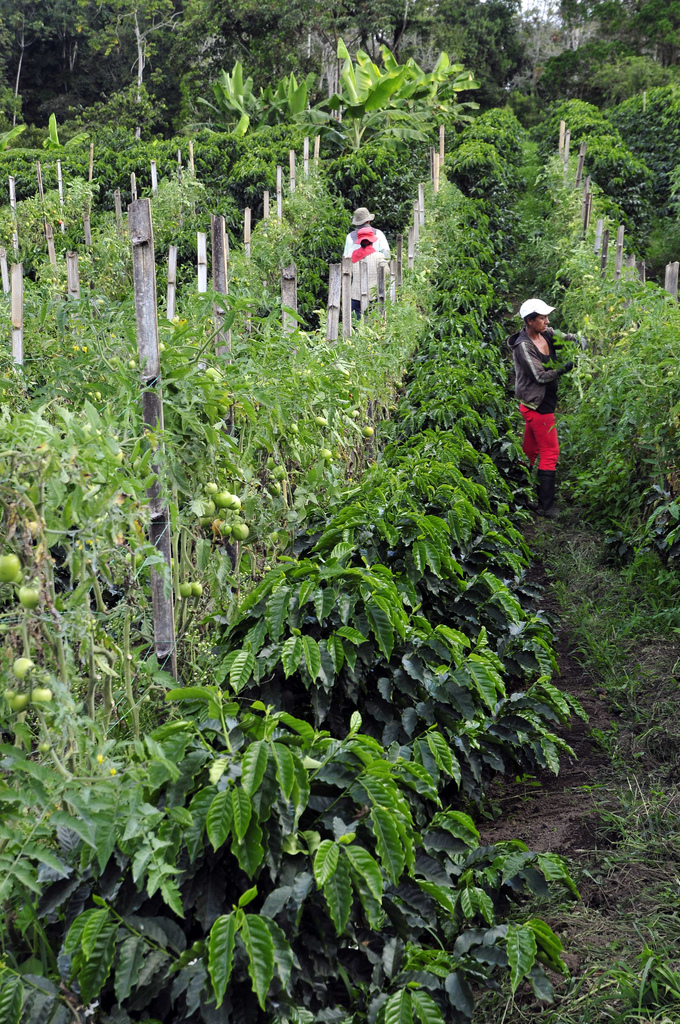
Intercropping coffee and tomatoes

=== Ecological benefits ===
The benefits of agroecology are not only economic, but also important ecologically. There is evidence to indicate that the agroecosystems with overstory shade trees like coffee or cacao plantations can rival the biodiversity of natural forests. The diversity is so high in these systems because the overstory is structurally and floristically complex which allows for many different niches to be available resulting in refuges. It is possible that shade coffee plantations are already serving as refuges, as seen in Puerto Rico where tremendous deforestation has occurred and yet the avian extinction rate is relatively low. Another system that is ecologically important is neotropical kitchen gardens. Kitchen gardens or home gardens are common in tropical and subtropical areas and they provide food and income for the family. Some kitchen gardens like the Mopan Mayan of southern Belize contain dozens of tree and plant species of different stories mimicking a natural forest. These patches, much like shade plantations, serve as refuges for flora and fauna such as in Belize where they are used by migratory birds.

Agroecological farms and methods also contribute to reducing the effects of climate change as they have more plants and thus greater carbon sequestration as well as limited emissions from farm management and crop transportation. Agroecology in Latin America also includes many ecological areas such as water conservation, soil health, and maintaining seed diversity, among others.

=== Social benefits ===
The principles of agroecology are also cultural and social. Agroecology is the “transformation of rural realities through collective action” for the goal of food sovereignty. Thus it is not just science and principles, but also a practice, which produces many social benefits as it is a combination of efforts between farmers, social movements, scientists, and NGOs, as well as occasionally local governments.

Food sovereignty is a core component of agroecology that increases social power. The definition of food sovereignty as defined by La Via Campesina, the social movement that articulated it, is the following:

"Food sovereignty is the right of peoples to healthy and culturally appropriate food produced through sustainable methods and their right to define their own food and agriculture systems. It develops a model of small scale sustainable production benefiting communities and their environment. Food sovereignty prioritizes local food production and consumption, giving a country the right to protect its local producers from cheap imports and to control its production. It includes the struggle for land and genuine agrarian reform that ensures that the rights to use and manage lands, territories, water, seeds, livestock, and biodiversity are in the hands of those who produce food and not of the corporate sector."

Thus, when communities, NGOs and the public move beyond the view of food security, i.e. having enough to eat, and transition to the framework of food sovereignty, much more progress can be made in ensuring people's well-being. Farmers then have control over how their food is produced, what is produced, and where it is sold, which must primarily be in local markets. Thus consumers also have close ties to the production process.

A key component of the agroecological method used to achieve food sovereignty is campesino-a-campesino, or farmer-to-farmer knowledge exchange, which is an effective way to strengthen social relations within and between communities. Similarly, the collaboration between researchers from universities and farmer research projects allows farmers to have greater social standing than in industrial agriculture where they are simply told what to do. Additionally, indigenous customs and knowledge are highly valued, whereas they have historically been considered irrelevant by most agronomists and "development experts".

Through the agroecological techniques that produce a higher and more diverse overall crop yield than industrial agriculture, small-scale farmers are able to be self-sufficient and at the same time produce excess to sell in local "solidarity markets," i.e. places where they have loyal customers. This is an effective form of poverty reduction because the greatest cause of poverty in rural Latin America is not having enough income from crops. With agroecological methods such as crop diversification, crops are much more resistant to drastic and unexpected effects of climate change, thus farmers' livelihoods are less vulnerable.

Another important social benefit is the part of agroecology that emphasizes agrarian reform, i.e. transitioning back to small-scale farms where farmers own their land vs. being workers on large, corporate-owned industrial farms. Social movements in Brazil such as the Landless Workers' Movement (MST) have successfully re-acquired land for subsistence farmers and farmer cooperatives.

== Role of social movements ==
Social movements play a significant role in the movement of agroecology in Latin America, which emerged in the scene of growing neoliberal globalization beginning in the 1970s. In this period, trans-national corporations began dominating the agricultural sector, causing food shortages, excess dependence on imports and agricultural inputs. It was in response to these effects that many social movements in Latin America formed.

One of the most prominent movements is La Via Campesina, an umbrella organization that connects many local farmer groups and movements. It began in 1993 when farmer representatives from four continents convened in their first conference, with many representatives from Latin America. it is now present in 73 countries all over the world, representing around 200 million farmers. La Via Campesina was the first to define food sovereignty at the World Food Summit in 1996. It began by demanding land for farmers through occupations, but soon expanded its goals to a much wider range of issues. Now its main goals are: defending food sovereignty, struggle for land and agrarian reforms; promoting agroecology and defending local seeds; promoting peasant rights and struggle against criminalization of peasants. It has also expanded its work to increasing communication and consensus with other users of land, conducting research, expanding its organizations that deal with legal support for occupations, and confronting negative stereotypes of occupations in the public eye. They hold an International Conference every four years, which is "the movement’s highest body for political discussion and decision-making, where future actions and agendas are defined." There have been such conferences since 1993, guiding the many other networks of action that members engage in around the world.

Another large movement is the Movimento dos Trabalhadores Rurais Sem Terra, or MST in Brazil. MST has been and continues to be one of the largest peasant-lead forces that drive agrarian reform. During the time of Presidents Lula and Cardoso, who prioritized agribusiness, little progress was made. But MST's alliance with La Via Campesina and its fight for agrarian reform explicitly tied to territorial issues still makes it a major driver in these questions: anywhere where there was successful reform, MST—the peasants themselves—were involved. Paradoxically, however, although MST and other organizations are relatively successful in acquiring land, simultaneously large agribusinesses are grabbing pieces of land from the Amazon.

In general, there are several trends present in Latin American peasant social movements. First, peasants have developed a political consciousness and identity even across borders. Second, they share the conviction that small scale agroecological practices actually have higher efficiency, resilience to climate change, and increased food security and sovereignty. Third, they engage in five major battles against agribusinesses:

- control of nature for sustainable local use
- the right of smallholder farmers to produce for livelihood and communities around them not for profit
- the fight for food sovereignty
- keeping GMO seeds out and allowing their own control of genetic diversity
- making production and market networks sustain the local needs.

== Role of research ==
Hand in hand with the work of social movements is the work of researchers at various universities throughout Latin America. There are now many agroecology departments throughout the continent, although they often struggle with limited funding and resources compared to large agronomy departments. One example of an organization that promotes agroecological research alongside dialogue with farmers is the Sociedad Cientifica Latinoamericana de Agroecologia (SOCLA), or Latin American Scientific Society of Agroecology. SOCLA organizes conferences every year in various locations in Latin America, where farmers, students, and researchers share knowledge, seeds, practices, and formulate strategies for the future.

== Examples by method ==
=== Shade Coffee ===
Shade-grown coffee is an ecologically and economically important agroecosystem in which coffee plants are grown in the understory of a tree canopy. The shade of the canopy over the coffee shrubs encourages natural ecological processes and species diversity. These shade coffee plantations are in many Latin American countries including Brazil, Mexico, Belize and Guatemala. Shade coffee growers maintain complex coffee agroforests in which they produce coffee and manage the area's biota.

Shade coffee differs from the industrial open sun coffee plantations that increase faster coffee growth and reduce costs but result in decreased biota resources, refuge, nutrient cycling and increased broken terrain and soil erosion. Studies have been done in Latin America to prove the biological importance of shade coffee. In 1996, a scientific journal discussed the evolving industrial coffee plantation effects on Northern Latin American countries. Areas of high deforestation where traditional shade coffee methods are used have been found to be a crucial refuge for many biota. Another study in Veracruz, Mexico on shade coffee ecological relationships found that areas of lower cloud forest that are now coffee plantations are also a microclimate for native orchids and pollinators.

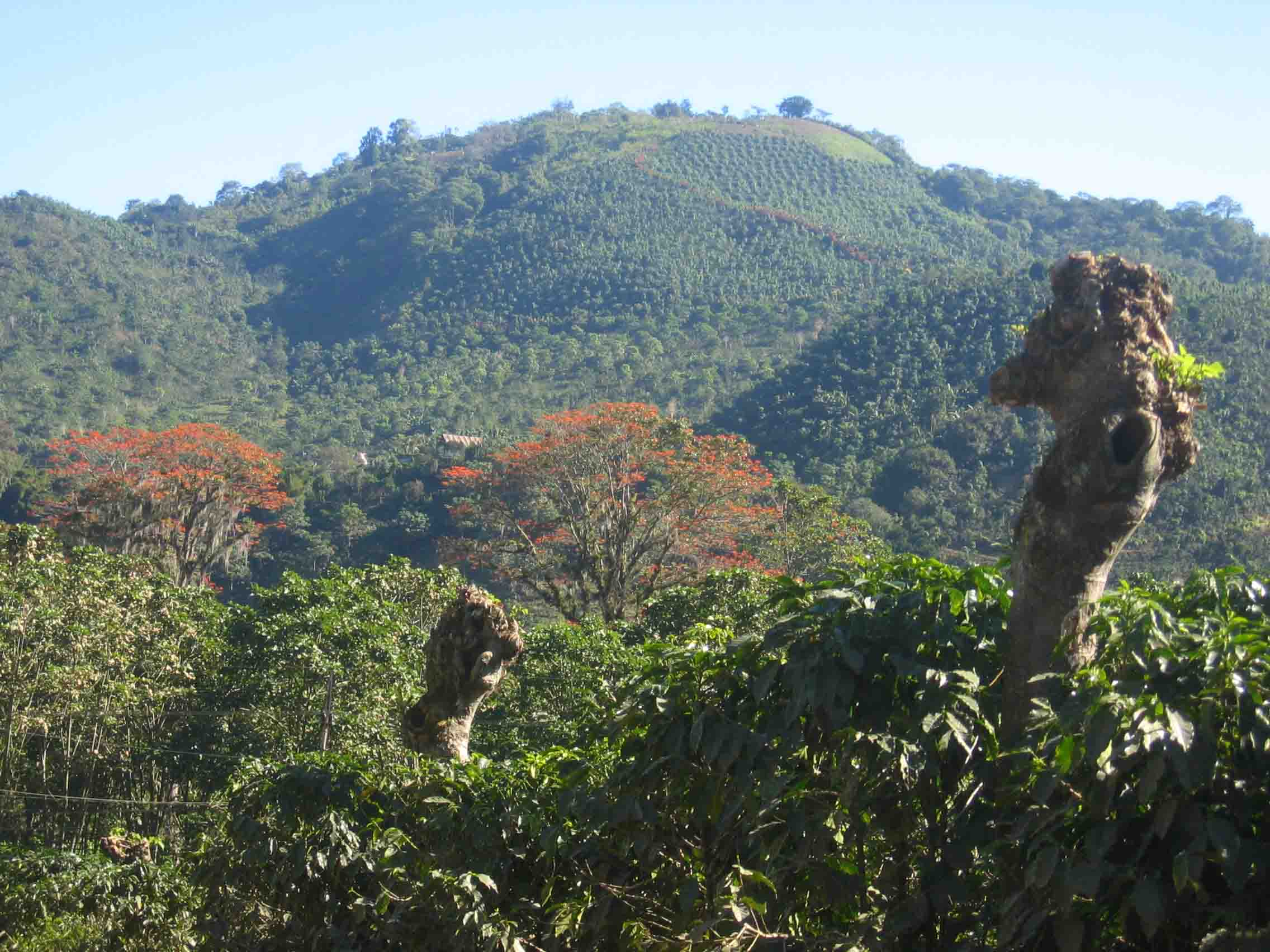
Coffee shadow trees Costa Rica

=== Shade cacao ===
Some cacao is now grown in cabrucas, an agroforestry system found in Belize, Mexico, Ecuador, Peru, Costa Rica and Brazil, in which cacao is grown underneath the canopy of mixed native trees. Cabrucas are largely run by smallholder farmers. As with shade coffee, the forest canopy for cacao production has been found to provide a diverse ecosystem. An example of the biological importance of cabrucas can be found in Brazil's main cacao production region Southern Bahia, Brazil. A 2008 study of biodiversity conservation in cacao regions found that the cabrucas in Southern Bahia are used by a significant proportion of native flora and fauna. Due to parts of the region experiencing high deforestation and fragmentation, these cabrucas are providing habitat, fragment connection, and edge effect reduction. Another study in Costa Rica on the role of these cacao plantations in maintaining avian diversity found that the plantations do not substitute for a forest but do provide a home for a large number of avian generalist species.

== Some examples by country ==
=== Cuba ===
Cuba is a unique example of successful agroecological transformation on a national level. In the beginning of the 20th century, Cuba was devastated socially and ecologically by industrial agro-inputs and chemicals and northern crop dumping, but the socialist revolution did not change that as large-scale industrial agriculture was still prioritized. Thus, once Cuba reached a crisis in the 1990s, it was determined to restructure its food system to emphasize smaller farms, local production, national and local self-sufficiency and food sovereignty. What followed was what is now known as Cuba's agroecological revolution, where small-scale farmers now produce more than 65% domestic food using only 25% of the country's land, most using agroecological methods. Its success lies in the dynamic grassroots organization of peasants with other peasants. These improvements in organization and adoption of agroecological methods over time have increased productivity dramatically, and thus also food sovereignty, as well as resilience to climate change.

=== Mexico ===
La Secundaria Técnica número 34 in Jojutla became the first middle school in the country to give classes in agroecology.

== See also ==
- Environmental history of Latin America
