= Food-feed system =

Livestock production using crops grown for human consumption

A food-feed system is an integrated livestock-crop production system where crops grown on farms are harvested for human consumption and the crop-residues or by-products are used as feed for livestock. For example, intercropping of cowpeas between rows of cassava. The legumes can enrich soil fertility and enhance the crop productivity. Further, the cassava hay can be used as dairy feed.
