= Equitability =

Mathematical criterion for fair division

Equitability is a criterion for fair division. A division is called equitable if the subjective value of all partners is the same, i.e., each partner is equally happy with his/her share. Mathematically, that means that for all partners i and j:

$$V_i(X_i) = V_j(X_j)$$

Where:

- $X_i$ is the part of the resource allocated to partner i;
- $V_i$ is the value function of partner i. Usually these functions are normalized such that $V_i(\emptyset)=0$ and $V_i(EntireCake)=1$ for every i.

== Comparison to other criteria ==
- Equitability (EQ) compares values of different people to different pieces;
- Envy-freeness (EF) compares values of the same person to different pieces;
- Exact division (EX) compares values of different people to the same pieces.

The following table illustrates the difference. In all examples there are two partners, Alice and Bob. Alice receives the left part and Bob receives the right part.

Division	EQ?	EF?	EX?
A: / 50% / 50%; B: / 50% / 50%	Yes	Yes	Yes
A: / 60% / 40%; B: / 40% / 60%	Yes	Yes	No (Alice and Bob don't agree on the values of the pieces).
A: / 40% / 60%; B: / 60% / 40%	Yes	No (Alice and Bob envy each other's share).	No
A: / 70% / 30%; B: / 40% / 60%	No (Alice enjoys her share more than Bob enjoys his share).	Yes	No
A: / 60% / 40%; B: / 60% / 40%	No	No (Bob envies Alice).	Yes
A: / 60% / 40%; B: / 70% / 30%	No	No	No

Note that the table has only 6 rows, because 2 combinations are impossible: an EX+EF division must be EQ, and an EX+EQ division must be EF.

== Existence and computation ==
Equitability has been mainly applied in the division of a heterogeneous continuous resource; see Equitable cake-cutting.

It has also been applied in the division of homogeneous resources; see Adjusted winner procedure.

Recently, it has also been studied in the context of fair item allocation. With indivisible items, an equitable allocation might not exist, but it can be approximated in several ways. For example, an allocation is called EQ1 if the difference between subjective valuations is at most a single item. It was studied for goods, for chores, for a goods on a path, and in conjunction with utilitarian optimality.
