= Surplus procedure =

Fair division protocol

The surplus procedure (SP) is a fair division protocol for cutting cake in a way that achieves proportional equitability between 2 people.

The surplus procedure was devised by Steven J. Brams, Michael A. Jones, and Christian Klamler in 2006.

In a nutshell, the procedure serves as an expansion of the "you cut I choose" method, having both participants serve as cutters. It has both participants privately disclose where they consider a fair halfway cut-point to be for the cake to a neutral arbitrator, who resolves the division of cake as follows:

1. If the cut location is the same for both, the cake is divided along the agree-upon line.
2. If the cut location differs (perhaps due to one area of the cake being valued more highly by one of the two for it containing the candle or more berries), then each participant is given "half" the cake according to their differing definitions, leaving a central column of surplus cake to be shared. The arbitrator "gives each person the same proportion of the cake that remains, called the surplus, as he or she values it". I.e. the person who valued berries more highly, having already secured the majority of the berries in their first "half", will receive a smaller portion of the middle, since they value it less.

It can be generalized to more than 2 people, and to dividing many kinds of goods, and is strategyproof. For 3 or more people it is not always possible to achieve a division that is both equitable and envy-free.

A generalization of the surplus procedure called the equitable procedure (EP) achieves a form of equitability. Equitability and envy-freeness can be incompatible for 3 or more players.

== Criticisms of the paper ==
There have been a few criticisms of aspects of the paper. In effect the paper should cite a weaker form of Pareto optimality and suppose the measures are always strictly positive.

== See also ==
- Adjusted winner procedure
- Approval voting
