= Cake-cutting =

Cake-cutting may refer to:

- Fair cake-cutting, a mathematical problem of fairly dividing a heterogenous resource among people with different preferences
  - Efficient cake-cutting, a similar division problem in economics and computer science
- Wedding-cake cutting, the habit of cutting the wedding cake and distributing it to the guests, as a symbol of fertility
