= Radon–Nikodym set =

Geometric object that represents a "cake"

In the theory of fair cake-cutting, the Radon–Nikodym set (RNS) is a geometric object that represents a cake, based on how different people evaluate the different parts of the cake.

== Example ==
Suppose we have a cake made of four parts. There are two people, Alice and George, with different tastes: each person values the different parts of the cake differently. The table below describes the parts and their values; the last row, "RNS Point", is explained afterwards.

	Chocolate	Lemon	Vanilla	Cherries
Alice's value	18	9	1	2
George's value	18	0	4	8
RNS point	(0.5,0.5)	(1,0)	(0.2,0.8)	(0.2,0.8)

The "RNS point" of a piece of cake describes the relative values of the partners to that piece. It has two coordinates – one for Alice and one for George. For example:

- The partners agree on the values for the chocolate part, so the coordinates of its RNS point are also equal (they are normalized such that their sum is 1).
- The lemon part is only valuable for Alice, so in its RNS point, only Alice's coordinate is 1 while George's coordinate is 0.
- In both the vanilla and the cherries part, the ratio between Alice's value to George's value is 1:4. Hence, this is also the ratio between the coordinates of their RNS points. Note that both the vanilla and the cherries are mapped to the same RNS point.

The RNS of a cake is just the set of all its RNS points; in the above cake this set contains three points: {(0.5,0.5), (1,0), (0.2,0.8)}. It can be represented by the segment (1,0)-(0,1):

(1.0, 0.0)	(0.9, 0.1)	(0.8, 0.2)	(0.7, 0.3)	(0.6, 0.4)	(0.5, 0.5)	(0.4, 0.6)	(0.3, 0.7)	(0.2, 0.8)	(0.1, 0.9)	(0.0, 1.0)
Lemon	–	–	–	–	Chocolate	–	–	Vanilla, Cherries	–	–

In effect, the cake is decomposed and re-constructed on the segment (1,0)-(0,1).

== Definitions ==
There is a set $C$ ("the cake"), and a set $\mathbb{C}$ which is a sigma-algebra of subsets of $C$.

There are $n$ partners. Every partner $i$ has a personal value measure $V_i: \mathbb{C} \to \mathbb{R}$. This measure determines how much each subset of $C$ is worth to that partner.

Define the following measure:

$$V = \sum_{i=1}^n V_i$$

Note that each $V_i$ is an absolutely continuous measure with respect to $V$. Therefore, by the Radon–Nikodym theorem, it has a Radon–Nikodym derivative, which is a function $v_i: C\to [0,\infty)$ such that for every measurable subset $X\in \mathbb{C}$:

$$V_i(X) = \int_X v_i \, dV$$

The $v_i$ are called value-density functions. They have the following properties, for almost all points of the cake $x\in C$:

- $\sum_{i=1}^n v_i(x) = 1$
- $\forall i: 0\leq v_i(x)\leq 1$

For every point $x\in C$, the RNS point of $x$ is defined by:

$$v(x) = (v_1(x),\dots,v_n(x))$$

Note that $v(x)$ is always a point in the $(n-1)$-dimensional unit simplex in $\mathbb{R}^n$, denoted by $\Delta^{n-1}$ (or just $\Delta$ when $n$ is clear from the context).

The RNS of a cake is the set of all its RNS points:

$$RNS(C) = \{v(x) \mid x\in C\}$$

The cake is decomposed and then re-constructed inside $\Delta$. Each vertex of $\Delta$ is associated with one of the n partners. Each fraction of the cake is mapped to a point in $\Delta$ according to the valuations: the more valuable a piece is to a partner, the closer it is to that partner's vertex. This is shown in the above example for $n=2$ partners (where $\Delta$ is just the segment between (1,0) and (0,1)). Akin describes the meaning of the RNS for $n=3$ partners:

We imagine a table shaped like an equilateral triangle with each consumer seated at a vertex... the desirability to consumer $i$ of a fragment of cake at a point $v \in \Delta$ is given by the barycentric coordinate $v_i$ measuring its closeness to vertex $i$. Thus, $v_i$ is 1 at the vertex and declines linearly to value 0 at the opposite face.

== Efficient RNS partitions ==
The unit simplex $\Delta$ can be partitioned among the partners, giving each partner $i$ a subset $\Delta_i$. Each such partition induces a partition of the cake $C$, in which partner $i$ receives the bits of $C$ whose RNS-points fall within $\Delta_i$.

Here are two example partitions for the two-partner example, where $\Delta$ is the segment between (1,0) and (0,1)

- Cut $\Delta$ in the point (0.4,0.6). Give the segment (1,0)-(0.4,0.6) to Alice and the segment (0.4,0.6)-(0,1) to George. This corresponds to giving the Lemon and Chocolate to Alice (total value 27) and the rest to George (total value 12).
- Cut in the same point (0.4,0.6), but give the segment (1,0)-(0.4,0.6) to George (total value 18) and the segment (0.4,0.6)-(0,1) to Alice (total value 3).

The first partition looks much more efficient than the second one: in the first partition, each partner is given the pieces that are more valuable to him/her (closer to his/her vertex of the simplex), while in the second partition the opposite is true. In fact, the first partition is Pareto efficient while the second partition is not. For example, in the second partition, Alice can give the cherries to George in exchange for 2/9 of the chocolate; this will improve Alice's utility by 2 and George's utility by 4. This example illustrates a general fact that we define below.

For every point $w = (w_1,\dots,w_n) \in \Delta$:

- Say that a partition of $\Delta = \Delta_1 \cup \cdots \cup \Delta_n$ belongs to $w$, if:

For all $i,j$ and for all $(v_1,\dots,v_n)\in \Delta_i$: $\frac{v_i}{v_j} \geq \frac{w_i}{w_j}$

- Say that a partition of $C = X_1 \cup \cdots \cup X_n$ belongs to $w$, if it is induced by a partition of $\Delta$ that belongs to $w$. I.e:

For all $i,j$ and for all $x \in X_i$: $\frac{v_i(x)}{v_j(x)} \geq \frac{w_i}{w_j}$

It is possible to prove that:

A partition $C = X_1 \cup \cdots \cup X_n$ belongs to a positive point $w = (w_1,\dots,w_n) \in \Delta^+$,
if-and-only-if it maximizes the sum: $\frac{V_1(X_1)}{w_1}+\cdots+\frac{V_1(X_n)}{w_n}$
I.e, iff it is a weighted-utilitarian-maximal division with weight vector $w$.

Since every Pareto-efficient division is weighetd-utilitarian-maximal for some selection of weights, the following theorem is also true:

A positive partition $C = X_1 \cup \cdots \cup X_n$ belongs to some positive point in $\Delta^+$,
if-and-only-if it is Pareto-efficient.

So there is a mapping between the set of Pareto-efficient partitions and the points in $\Delta$.

Returning to the above example:

- The first partition (giving the Lemon and Chocolate to Alice and the rest to George) belongs to the point $(0.4,0.6)$, as well as to other points such as $(0.3,0.7)$ (some partitions belong to more than one point). Indeed, it is a utilitarian cake-cutting that maximizes the sum $\frac{V_\text{Alice}}{0.4} + \frac{V_\text{George}}{0.6}$, and it is also Pareto-efficient.
- In contrast, the second partition does not belong to any point, and indeed it is not Pareto-efficient.
- There are some points to which many different partitions belong. For example, the point $(0.5,0.5)$. This is a point of the RNS and there is a positive mass of cake associated with it, so any partition of that mass leads to a partition that belongs to $(0.5,0.5)$. For example, giving the Lemon and Chocolate to Alice (value 27) and the rest to George (value 12) belongs to $(0.5,0.5)$; giving only the Lemon to Alice (value 9) and the rest to George (value 30) also belongs to it; giving the Lemon and half the chocolate to Alice (value 18) and the rest to George (value 21) also belongs to it; etc. All these partitions maximize the sum $\frac{V_\text{Alice}}{0.5} + \frac{V_\text{George}}{0.5}$; indeed, this sum is 78 in all these partitions. They are all Pareto-efficient.

== History ==
The RNS was introduced as part of the Dubins–Spanier theorems and used in the proof of Weller's theorem and later results by Ethan Akin. The term "Radon–Nikodym set" was coined by Julius Barbanel. Ultimately named after Johann Radon and Otto M. Nikodym.

== See also ==
- Individual pieces set
