= Economic equality =

Economic equality may refer to:

- Equality (economics)
- Equity (economics)
