= Boltzmann Fair Division =

Probabilistic model of fair resource allocation

Boltzmann Fair Division is a probabilistic model of resource allocation inspired by the Boltzmann distribution in statistical mechanics. The model introduces a concept called distribution potential, integrating human factors such as contribution, need, and preference. Based on this potential, resources are allocated spontaneously and probabilistically, without negotiation or strategic behavior. The model has been proposed as an alternative framework for analyzing real-world distribution problems including income redistribution, emissions trading, and public policy design.

The principle has also received extensive coverage in both international and Korean media for its innovative and practical approach to distributive justice, including reports in Phys.org, Mirage News, Asia Economy, Unipress, Patent News, Ulsan Jeil Ilbo, Seoul Shinmun, ChosunBiz, MK News, Nate News, UNIST News Center, and other outlets.

== Background ==
Traditional theories of distributive justice—such as egalitarianism, meritocracy, needs-based allocation, Rawlsian justice, and Nozick’s entitlement theory—rely on distinct normative principles. However, these principles often conflict or are impractical to apply simultaneously. Boltzmann Fair Division has been proposed as a mathematical model that can represent a variety of distributive logics using a single adjustable parameter, β.

== Mathematical Structure ==
The probability $P_j$ that a resource unit is allocated to participant $j$ is defined as:

$$P_j = \frac{e^{\beta x_j}}{\sum_k e^{\beta x_k}}$$

where:

- $x_j$ is the distribution potential of participant $j$ (including contribution, need, and preference)
- $\beta$ is a dispersion parameter.
  - When $\beta = 0$, allocation is equal.
  - As $\beta \to \infty$, allocation becomes meritocratic.

== Key Properties ==
1. Spontaneous allocation: Resources are allocated without negotiation, emotion, or strategic action, allowing for impartiality in distribution.
2. Entropy-based mechanism: The model uses entropy maximization, a principle often linked to fairness and balance in both natural and social systems.
3. Incorporation of heterogeneity: Contribution, need, and preference are all integrated into the distribution potential.
4. Single-parameter flexibility: A single β parameter allows continuous adjustment between egalitarian and meritocratic distributions, making the model adaptable to different philosophies of fairness.
5. Integrability with welfare functions: The model can be combined with social welfare optimization frameworks, such as maximizing total utility.
6. Inclusiveness: Even participants with zero contribution retain a non-zero probability of receiving resources, as noted by both academic and media commentators.
7. Scalability: The mathematical structure remains simple and efficient regardless of the number of participants.

== Comparison with Traditional Theories ==
Theory	Principle	Relation to Boltzmann Division
Egalitarianism	Equal shares	Equivalent when β = 0
Meritocracy	Allocation by contribution	Similar when β is high; low contributors still receive something
Needs-based	Allocation by need	Needs can be reflected in distribution potential
Rawlsian justice	Maximin principle	Implementable via welfare optimization
Nozick's theory	Historical entitlement	Focuses on end states, not initial acquisitions

== Applications ==
The Boltzmann fair division principle has been applied and discussed in various contexts, in both academic research and the media.

- Emissions trading: In an international simulation involving eight countries, the Boltzmann model demonstrated favorable outcomes for both fairness and efficiency compared to conventional free allocation or auction-based systems.
- Income redistribution: The model has been used to analyze income distribution in countries such as the U.S., China, Finland, South Africa, and Thailand, providing quantitative criteria for feasible equality and fair allocation.
- Public policy: Boltzmann fair division has been considered in the allocation of public goods and resources, including vaccine distribution and government budget planning.
- Game-theory alternative: The model offers a non-strategic, entropy-based allocation mechanism that does not depend on behavioral assumptions, attracting attention as a potential alternative to traditional game-theoretic approaches.
- AI fair division: In algorithmic resource allocation and digital attention markets—such as cloud/GPU scheduling, bandwidth quotas, ad impressions, and exposure in search/recommender systems—Boltzmann/softmax rules and entropy-regularized optimal transport (e.g., Sinkhorn scaling) enable probabilistic and scalable allocations that trade off efficiency with dispersion while accommodating individual/group fairness constraints and minimum guarantees.
- Online fair division (personalized 2-value): Sequential (online) allocation with personalized bivalued valuations has been studied as a complementary algorithmic approach to entropy-based rules, providing worst-case fairness guarantees in streaming settings.

== Thought Experiment: Dividing Cake on Mars ==
A thought experiment featured in the LSE blog imagines a scenario in which five Mars explorers with different levels of contribution, need, and preference must share a limited cake. Unlike traditional methods that rely on equality or negotiation, the Boltzmann model proposes a spontaneous, unbiased distribution governed by the exponential probability function. This metaphor illustrates how a physically inspired allocation model might apply to both future and present resource challenges.

== Limitations and further research ==
While the Boltzmann fair division principle has been positively received for its simplicity and flexibility, some commentators have noted that real-world applications may face challenges in accurately quantifying individual distribution potential, such as need or contribution. Further research is needed to assess the effectiveness of the model in diverse social and economic contexts.

== Media coverage and reception ==
The Boltzmann fair division principle has attracted attention from both international and domestic media. Phys.org described it as “a simple yet versatile solution for real-world fairness and distributive justice.” Major Korean news outlets such as Asia Economy also covered the model, highlighting its potential as an alternative to traditional distribution methods in policy and economics. Academic blogs such as the LSE Public Policy Blog have discussed practical thought experiments illustrating the model's application in complex resource allocation scenarios.

== See also ==
- Distributive justice
- Fair division
- Resource allocation
- Entropy
- Social justice
- Income inequality
- Utility theory
- Statistical mechanics
- Public policy
- Universal basic income
- Artificial intelligence
- Automation
- Algorithmic fairness
- AI fair division
