= Equity (economics) =

Economic concept of fairness

Economic equity is the construct, concept or idea of fairness in economics and justice in the distribution of wealth, resources, and taxation within a society. Equity is closely tied to taxation policies, welfare economics, and the discussions of public finance, influencing how resources are allocated among different segments of the population.

== Overview ==
According to Peter Corning, there are three distinct categories of substantive fairness (equality, equity, and reciprocity) that must be combined and balanced in order to achieve a truly fair society. While most of middle-income countries increased inequality in recent years, middle classes and—to a lesser extent—poorer-income groups seem to be getting an increasing share of income in recent years. To some, this advance is still vulnerable and needs to be quickly accelerated in the twenty-first century

== Definitions of equity ==
Equity in economics refers to a condition of fairness where the economic processes and their outcomes do not unduly favor or disadvantage any particular group or individual. This sense of fairness, or economic justice, attempts to balance economic disparities among different societal segments to promote a more inclusive and just society. Equity is a central issue in public sector economics and in public policy. It is at the heart of almost all economics policy debates, which underscores the integral role that equity plays in shaping public decisions that impact overall societal welfare.

Equity looks at the distribution of capital, goods, and access to services throughout an economy and is often measured using tools such as the Gini index. Equity may be distinguished from economic efficiency in overall evaluation of social welfare. Although 'equity' has broader uses, it may be posed as a counterpart to economic inequality in yielding a "good" distribution of wealth. It has been studied in experimental economics as inequity aversion.

== Difficulty in defining equity ==
Defining equity presents inherent challenges due to its subjective nature, which depends heavily on societal values and individual perceptions of what is considered fair. Economists often struggle to establish a universally accepted definition of distributional equity because it involves making interpersonal comparisons of utility, which are inherently complex and controversial. Public finance in theory and practice highlights this difficulty: "Economists find it difficult to formulate an acceptable definition of distributional equity because it would require interpersonal comparisons of utility." In practice, it may prove impossible to equalise choices without seriously impeding social objectives in other areas, such as the attainment of efficiency or the preservation of liberty. This complexity is a significant barrier to forming a consensus on what constitutes equitable outcomes in economic policy.

== Horizontal vs. vertical equity ==
The concept of horizontal equity means treating people alike if they are in the same or similar economic situations—making them pay the same taxes and/or providing them with the same public services. Implicit in the notion of horizontal equity is an assumption that people’s capacity to enjoy income is similar, at least within a given range of incomes. This principle underpins many tax systems, advocating that those with comparable incomes should incur similar tax burdens. However, the practical implementation of horizontal equity is fraught with challenges, as defining what constitutes similar economic situations can be highly subjective and complex. Much of the complexity in the federal income tax arises from attempts to define equal economic situations for purposes of horizontal equity.

A second and even more challenging concept of equity is vertical equity. Vertical equity means treating people differently according to the differences in their income, wealth, or other measure of need or ability to pay. It is typically advocating that those who are better off should contribute more to the public coffers. This principle supports progressive taxation, where tax rates escalate with an individual's income or wealth. The rationale for vertical equity involves recognizing different capacities and needs among the population, which should influence their tax contributions. However, like horizontal equity, vertical equity also encounters practical difficulties. For example, one difficulty with using vertical equity as a guide to public policy is in measurement. Attempting to determine vertical equity also raises the serious problems discussed earlier that are associated with interpersonal comparisons of utility.

== Equity axioms ==
Equity axioms are theoretical constructs that provide frameworks for understanding and implementing fairness in economic policies. While there are many variants of equity principles, they could be divided in two broad categories, namely, procedural and consequentialist.

Among these, Hammond’s equity principle is notable. It suggests that a progressive transfer—redistributing income from richer to poorer individuals without altering their relative positions in terms of utility—enhances overall welfare. This principle is grounded in the belief that "an increase in one person's utility matched with a decrease in another person's utility that does not alter their respective positions on the utility scale – what we refer to as a Hammond progressive transfer – constitutes a welfare improvement.“

Another axiom is Sen's weak equity axiom, which states: "Let person i have a lower level of welfare than person j for each level of individual income. Then in distributing a given total of income among n individuals including i and j, the optimal solution must give i a higher level of income than j." This axiom prioritizes the needs of the most disadvantaged when allocating resources, ensuring that equity considerations directly influence economic outcomes.

== Equity in taxation ==
The role of equity in taxation is pivotal. An equitable tax system aims to distribute the financial burden fairly across different income groups, ensuring that everyone contributes their fair share towards public services. The principles of horizontal and vertical equity are often discussed regarding taxation.

In public finance, horizontal equity is the idea that people with a similar ability to pay taxes should pay the same or similar amounts. It is related to the concept of tax neutrality or the idea that the tax system should not discriminate between similar things or people, or unduly distort behavior.

Vertical equity usually refers to the idea that people with a greater ability to pay taxes should pay more. If the rich pay more in proportion to their income, this is known as a proportional tax; if they pay an increasing proportion, this is termed a progressive tax, sometimes associated with redistribution of wealth. Progressive tax is one of the main financial tools to help decrease the inequality between income groups.

In addition, Equity may also refer to inter-nation equity. As a theory, inter-nation equity is concerned with the allocation of national gain and loss in the international context and aims to ensure that each country receives an equitable share of tax revenues from cross-border transactions. The tax policy principle of inter-nation equity has been an important consideration in the debate on the division of taxing rights between source and residence countries.

== Fair division ==
Equitability in fair division means every person's subjective valuation of their own share of some goods is the same. The surplus procedure (SP) achieves a more complex variant called proportional equitability. For more than two people, a division cannot always both be equitable and envy-free.

== See also ==
- Distributive justice
- Educational equity
- Equity (law)
- Excess burden of taxation
- Fiscal illusion
- List of sovereign states by tax revenue to GDP ratio
- Progressive tax
- Proportional tax
- Tax incidence
