= Dubins–Spanier theorems =

Measure theory theorems

The Dubins–Spanier theorems are several theorems in the theory of fair cake-cutting. They were published by Lester Dubins and Edwin Spanier in 1961. Although the original motivation for these theorems is fair division, they are in fact general theorems in measure theory.

== Setting ==
There is a set $U$, and a set $\mathbb{U}$ which is a sigma-algebra of subsets of $U$.

There are $n$ partners. Every partner $i$ has a personal value measure $V_i: \mathbb{U} \to \mathbb{R}$. This function determines how much each subset of $U$ is worth to that partner.

Let $X$ a partition of $U$ to $k$ measurable sets: $U = X_1 \sqcup \cdots \sqcup X_k$. Define the matrix $M_X$ as the following $n\times k$ matrix:

$$M_X[i,j] = V_i(X_j)$$

This matrix contains the valuations of all players to all pieces of the partition.

Let $\mathbb{M}$ be the collection of all such matrices (for the same value measures, the same $k$, and different partitions):

$$\mathbb{M} = \{M_X \mid X\text{ is a }k\text{-partition of } U\}$$

The Dubins–Spanier theorems deal with the topological properties of $\mathbb{M}$.

== Statements ==
If all value measures $V_i$ are countably-additive and nonatomic, then:

- $\mathbb{M}$ is a compact set;
- $\mathbb{M}$ is a convex set.

This was already proved by Dvoretzky, Wald, and Wolfowitz.

== Corollaries ==
=== Consensus partition ===
A cake partition $X$ to k pieces is called a consensus partition with weights $w_1, w_2, \ldots, w_k$ (also called exact division) if:

$$\forall i \in \{1,\dots, n\}: \forall j \in \{1,\dots, k\}: V_i(X_j) = w_j$$

I.e, there is a consensus among all partners that the value of piece j is exactly $w_j$.

Suppose, from now on, that $w_1, w_2, \ldots, w_k$ are weights whose sum is 1:

$$\sum_{j=1}^k w_j =1$$

and the value measures are normalized such that each partner values the entire cake as exactly 1:

$$\forall i \in \{1,\dots, n\}: V_i(U) = 1$$

The convexity part of the DS theorem implies that:

If all value measures are countably-additive and nonatomic,
then a consensus partition exists.

PROOF: For every $j \in \{1,\dots, k\}$, define a partition $X^j$ as follows:

$$X^j_j = U$$
$$\forall r\neq j: X^j_r = \emptyset$$

In the partition $X^j$, all partners value the $j$-th piece as 1 and all other pieces as 0. Hence, in the matrix $M_{X^j}$, there are ones on the $j$-th column and zeros everywhere else.

By convexity, there is a partition $X$ such that:

$$M_X = \sum_{j=1}^k w_j\cdot M_{X^j}$$

In that matrix, the $j$-th column contains only the value $w_j$. This means that, in the partition $X$, all partners value the $j$-th piece as exactly $w_j$.

Note: this corollary confirms a previous assertion by Hugo Steinhaus. It also gives an affirmative answer to the problem of the Nile provided that there are only a finite number of flood heights.

=== Super-proportional division ===
A cake partition $X$ to n pieces (one piece per partner) is called a super-proportional division with weights $w_1, w_2, ..., w_n$ if:

$$\forall i \in 1\dots n: V_i(X_i) > w_i$$

I.e, the piece allotted to partner $i$ is strictly more valuable for him than what he deserves. The following statement is Dubins-Spanier Theorem on the existence of super-proportional division

Theorem—With these notations, let $w_1, w_2, ..., w_n$ be weights whose sum is 1, assume that the point $w:=(w_1, w_2, ..., w_n)$ is an interior point of the (n-1)-dimensional simplex with coordinates pairwise different, and assume that the value measures $V_1, ..., V_n$ are normalized such that each partner values the entire cake as exactly 1 (i.e. they are non-atomic probability measures). If at least two of the measures $V_i, V_j$ are not equal ( $V_i\neq V_j$), then super-proportional divisions exist.

The hypothesis that the value measures $V_1, ..., V_n$ are not identical is necessary. Otherwise, the sum $\sum_{i=1}^n V_i(X_i) =\sum_{i=1}^n V_1(X_i) > \sum_{i=1}^n w_i =1$ leads to a contradiction.

Namely, if all value measures are countably-additive and non-atomic, and if there are two partners $i,j$ such that $V_i\neq V_j$, then a super-proportional division exists.I.e, the necessary condition is also sufficient.

== Sketch of Proof ==
Suppose w.l.o.g. that $V_1 \neq V_2$. Then there is some piece of the cake, $Z\subseteq U$, such that $V_1(Z)>V_2(Z)$. Let $\overline{Z}$ be the complement of $Z$; then $V_2(\overline{Z})>V_1(\overline{Z})$. This means that $V_1(Z) + V_2(\overline{Z}) > 1$. However, $w_1+w_2\leq 1$. Hence, either $V_1(Z)>w_1$ or $V_2(\overline{Z})>w_2$. Suppose w.l.o.g. that $V_1(Z)>V_2(Z)$ and $V_1(Z)>w_1$ are true.

Define the following partitions:

- $X^1$: the partition that gives $Z$ to partner 1, $\overline{Z}$ to partner 2, and nothing to all others.
- $X^i$ (for $i\geq 2$): the partition that gives the entire cake to partner $i$ and nothing to all others.

Here, we are interested only in the diagonals of the matrices $M_{X^j}$, which represent the valuations of the partners to their own pieces:

- In $\textrm{diag}(M_{X^1})$, entry 1 is $V_1(Z)$, entry 2 is $V_2(\overline{Z})$, and the other entries are 0.
- In $\textrm{diag}(M_{X^i})$ (for $i\geq 2$), entry $i$ is 1 and the other entires are 0.

By convexity, for every set of weights $z_1, z_2, ..., z_n$ there is a partition $X$ such that:

$$M_X = \sum_{j=1}^n {z_j\cdot M_{X^j}}.$$

It is possible to select the weights $z_i$ such that, in the diagonal of $M_X$, the entries are in the same ratios as the weights $w_i$. Since we assumed that $V_1(Z)>w_1$, it is possible to prove that $\forall i \in 1\dots n: V_i(X_i) > w_i$, so $X$ is a super-proportional division.

=== Utilitarian-optimal division ===
A cake partition $X$ to n pieces (one piece per partner) is called utilitarian-optimal if it maximizes the sum of values. I.e, it maximizes:

$$\sum_{i=1}^n{V_i(X_i)}$$

Utilitarian-optimal divisions do not always exist. For example, suppose $U$ is the set of positive integers. There are two partners. Both value the entire set $U$ as 1. Partner 1 assigns a positive value to every integer and partner 2 assigns zero value to every finite subset. From a utilitarian point of view, it is best to give partner 1 a large finite subset and give the remainder to partner 2. When the set given to partner 1 becomes larger and larger, the sum-of-values becomes closer and closer to 2, but it never approaches 2. So there is no utilitarian-optimal division.

The problem with the above example is that the value measure of partner 2 is finitely-additive but not countably-additive.

The compactness part of the DS theorem immediately implies that:

If all value measures are countably-additive and nonatomic,
then a utilitarian-optimal division exists.

In this special case, non-atomicity is not required: if all value measures are countably-additive, then a utilitarian-optimal partition exists.

=== Leximin-optimal division ===
A cake partition $X$ to n pieces (one piece per partner) is called leximin-optimal with weights $w_1, w_2, ..., w_n$ if it maximizes the lexicographically-ordered vector of relative values. I.e, it maximizes the following vector:

$${V_1(X_1) \over w_1}, {V_2(X_2) \over w_2}, \dots , {V_n(X_n) \over w_n}$$

where the partners are indexed such that:

$${V_1(X_1) \over w_1} \leq {V_2(X_2) \over w_2} \leq \dots \leq {V_n(X_n) \over w_n}$$

A leximin-optimal partition maximizes the value of the poorest partner (relative to his weight); subject to that, it maximizes the value of the next-poorest partner (relative to his weight); etc.

The compactness part of the DS theorem immediately implies that:

If all value measures are countably-additive and nonatomic,
then a leximin-optimal division exists.

== Further developments ==
- The leximin-optimality criterion, introduced by Dubins and Spanier, has been studied extensively later. In particular, in the problem of cake-cutting, it was studied by Marco Dall'Aglio.

== See also ==
- Lyapunov vector-measure theorem
- Weller's theorem
