= Piecewise-constant valuation =

Piece-wise division of objects

A piecewise-constant valuation is a kind of a function that represents the utility of an agent over a continuous resource, such as land. It occurs when the resource can be partitioned into a finite number of regions, and in each region, the value-density of the agent is constant. A piecewise-uniform valuation is a piecewise-constant valuation in which the constant is the same in all regions.

Piecewise-constant and piecewise-uniform valuations are particularly useful in algorithms for fair cake-cutting.

== Formal definition ==
There is a resource represented by a set C. There is a valuation over the resource, defined as a continuous measure $V: 2^C\to \mathbb{R}$. The measure V can be represented by a value-density function $v: C\to \mathbb{R}$. The value-density function assigns, to each point of the resource, a real value. The measure V of each subset X of C is the integral of v over X.

A valuation V is called piecewise-constant, if the corresponding value-density function v is a piecewise-constant function. In other words: there is a partition of the resource C into finitely many regions, C_{1},...,C_{k}, such that for each j in 1,...,k, the function v inside C_{j} equals some constant U_{j}.

A valuation V is called piecewise-uniform if the constant is the same for all regions, that is, for each j in 1,...,k, the function v inside C_{j} equals some constant U.

== Generalization ==
A piecewise-linear valuation is a generalization of piecewise-constant valuation in which the value-density in each region j is a linear function, a_{j}x+b_{j} (piecewise-constant corresponds to the special case in which a_{j}=0 for all j).
