= Steven Brams =

American mathematician (born 1940)

Steven J. Brams
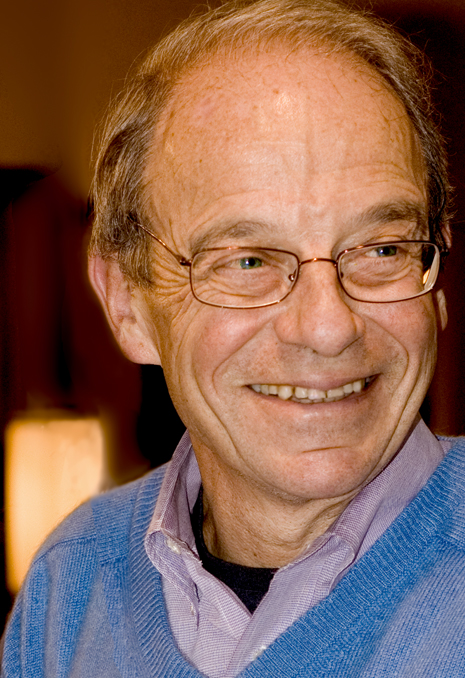
- Brams in 2006
- Born: Steven J. Brams; November 28, 1940 (age 85); Concord, New Hampshire
- Education: Massachusetts Institute of Technology; Northwestern University
- Known for: Independent discoverer of approval voting Solved the problem of envy-free cake-cutting Has applied game theory to a wide range of strategic situations
- Scientific career
- Fields: Political science
- Workplaces: Syracuse University; New York University

Steven J. Brams (born November 28, 1940) is an American game theorist and political scientist at the New York University Department of Politics. Brams is best known for using the techniques of game theory, public choice theory, and social choice theory to analyze voting systems and fair division. He is one of the independent discoverers of approval voting, as well as extensions of approval voting to multiple-winner elections to give proportional representation of different interests.

Brams was a co-discoverer, with Alan Taylor, of the first envy-free cake-cutting solution for n people. Previous to the Brams-Taylor procedure, the cake-cutting problem had been one of the most important open problems in contemporary mathematics. He is co-inventor with Taylor of the fair-division procedure, adjusted winner, which was patented by New York University in 1999 (# 5,983,205).

Brams has applied game theory to a wide variety of strategic situations, from the Bible and theology to international relations to sports.

== Education ==
Brams earned his B.S. at Massachusetts Institute of Technology in Politics, Economics, and Science in 1962. In 1966, he earned his Ph.D. in Political Science at Northwestern University.

== Career ==
Brams worked briefly in U.S. federal government positions and for the Institute for Defense Analyses before taking an assistant professor position at Syracuse University in 1967. He moved to New York University in 1969, where he is professor in the Department of Politics. He has been a visiting professor at the University of Rochester, the University of Michigan, the University of California, Irvine, the University of Pennsylvania, and Yale University.

In 1990–1991 he was president of the Peace Science Society (International); in 2004–2006, he was president of the Public Choice Society. He is a Guggenheim Fellow (1986–87), an American Association for the Advancement of Science Fellow (1992), and was a Russell Sage Foundation Visiting Scholar (1998–99).

== Bibliography ==
- Game Theory and Politics. New York: Free Press, 1975. Rev. ed., 2004 (Dover).
- Paradoxes in Politics: An Introduction to the Nonobvious in Political Science. New York: Free Press, 1976.
- The Presidential Election Game. New Haven, CT: Yale University Press, 1978. Rev. ed., 2008 (A K Peters).
- Co-edited with A. Schotter and G. Schwödiauer, Applied Game Theory: Proceedings of a Conference, Vienna, 1978. Würzburg, Germany: Physica-Verlag, 1979.
- Biblical Games: Game Theory and the Hebrew Bible. Cambridge, MA: MIT Press, 1980. Rev. ed., 2003 (MIT Press). Japanese and Russian translations, 2006.
- Co-edited with William F. Lucas and Philip D. Straffin, Jr., Modules in Applied Mathematics: Political and Related Models, vol. 2. New York: Springer-Verlag, 1983.
- Co-authored with Peter C. Fishburn, Approval Voting. Cambridge, MA: Birkhäuser Boston, 1983. Rev. ed., 2007 (Springer).
- Superior Beings: If They Exist, How Would We Know? Game-Theoretic Implications of Omniscience, Omnipotence, Immortality, and Incomprehensibility. New York: Springer-Verlag, 1983. Rev. ed., 2007 (Springer).
- Superpower Games: Applying Game Theory to Superpower Conflict. New Haven, CT: Yale University Press, 1985.
- Rational Politics: Decisions, Games, and Strategy. Washington, DC: CQ Press, 1985. Reprinted by Academic Press, 1989.
- Co-authored with D. Marc Kilgour, Game Theory and National Security. New York: Basil Blackwell, 1988. Spanish translation, 1989.
- Negotiation Games: Applying Game Theory to Bargaining and Arbitration. New York: Routledge, 1990. Rev. ed., 2003.
- Theory of Moves. Cambridge, UK: Cambridge University Press, 1994.
- Co-authored with Alan D. Taylor, Fair Division: From Cake-Cutting to Dispute Resolution. Cambridge, UK: Cambridge University Press, 1996.
- Co-authored with Alan D. Taylor, The Win-Win Solution: Guaranteeing Fair Shares to Everybody. New York: W. W. Norton, 1999. Japanese, Portuguese, and Spanish translations, 2000; Chinese, Korean, and Russian translations, 2002.
- Mathematics and Democracy: Designing Better Voting and Fair-Division Procedures. Princeton, NJ: Princeton University Press, 2008.
- Co-edited with William V. Gehrlein and Fred S. Roberts. The Mathematics of Preference, Choice, and Order: Essays in Honor of Peter C. Fishburn. Berlin: Springer, 2009.
- Game Theory and the Humanities: Bridging Two Worlds. Cambridge, MA: MIT Press, 2011.
- Divine Games: Game Theory and the Undecidability of a Superior Being. Cambridge, MA: MIT Press, 2018
