= Alan D. Taylor =

American mathematician

- Born: October 27, 1947 (age 78); United States
- Education: Dartmouth College
- Known for: Brams–Taylor procedure
- Scientific career
- Fields: Mathematics
- Workplaces: Union College
- Doctoral advisor: James Earl Baumgartner

Alan Dana Taylor (born October 27, 1947) is an American mathematician who, with Steven Brams, solved the problem of envy-free cake-cutting for an arbitrary number of people with the Brams–Taylor procedure.

Taylor received his Ph.D. in 1975 from Dartmouth College.

He was the Marie Louise Bailey professor of mathematics at Union College, in Schenectady, New York. He retired from the college in 2022.

== Selected publications ==
- Alan D. Taylor (1995) Mathematics and Politics: Strategy, Voting, Power, and Proof Springer-Verlag. ISBN 0-387-94391-9 and 0-387-94500-8; with Allison Pacelli: Taylor, Alan D.; Pacelli, Allison M. (2008). 2nd edition. ISBN 9780387776439.
- Steven J. Brams and Alan D. Taylor (1995). An Envy-Free Cake Division Protocol American Mathematical Monthly, 102, pp. 9–18. (JSTOR)
- Steven J. Brams and Alan D. Taylor (1996). Fair Division - From cake-cutting to dispute resolution Cambridge University Press. ISBN 0-521-55390-3 and ISBN 0-521-55644-9
