= Chore =

Chore may refer to one of the following:

- House work
- Bads in economics
  - Chore division
- Housekeeping
- Handyman work (odd jobs)
- Biochore, parts of the biosphere with similar environmental conditions
- Chore (band), a Canadian rock band
- Édgar Mejía (El Chore, born 1988), Mexican footballer
- Chore jacket

== See also ==
- Choré (disambiguation)
- Choron (disambiguation)
- Chorion, a fetal membrane
