= Chor =

Chor may refer to:

== People with the name ==
- Benny Chor (1956–2021), Israeli computer scientist
- Chor Chee Heung, Malaysian politician
- Chor Hooi Yee, Malaysian badminton player
- Chor Lau Heung, fictional character
- Chor Yeok Eng, Singaporean politician
- Chor Yuen, Chinese film director and actor

== Other uses ==
- Chhor, Sindh, a town in Pakistan
- River Chor, a river in England
- CHOR, a Canadian radio station

== See also ==
- Choir
- Chore (disambiguation)
- Chors (disambiguation)
- Khor (disambiguation)
