= Robertson–Webb query model =

Model of computation used by algorithms

In computer science, the Robertson–Webb (RW) query model is a model of computation used by algorithms for the problem of fair cake-cutting. In this problem, there is a resource called a "cake", and several agents with different value measures on the cake. The goal is to divide the cake among the agents such that each agent will consider his/her piece as "fair" by his/her personal value measure. Since the agents' valuations can be very complex, they cannot - in general - be given as inputs to a fair division algorithm. The RW model specifies two kinds of queries that a fair division algorithm may ask the agents: Eval and Cut. Informally, an Eval query asks an agent to specify his/her value to a given piece of the cake, and a Cut query (also called a Mark query) asks an agent to specify a piece of cake with a given value.

Despite the simplicity of the model, many classic cake-cutting algorithms can be described only by these two queries. On the other hand, there are fair cake-cutting problems that provably cannot be solved in the RW model using finitely many queries.

The Eval and Cut queries were first described in the book of Jack M. Robertson and William A. Webb. The name "Robertson–Webb model" was coined and formalized by Woeginger and Sgall.

== Definitions ==
The standard RW model assumes that the cake is an interval, usually the interval [0,1]. There are n agents, and each agent i has a value measure v_{i} on the cake. The algorithm does not know v_{i}, but can access it using two kinds of queries:

- An eval query: given two real numbers x and y, Eval_{i}(x,y) asks agent i to report the value of the interval [x,y], i.e., v_{i} ([x,y]).
- A mark query (also called a cut query): given two real numbers x and r, Mark_{i}(x,r) asks agent i to report some value y such that v_{i}([x,y]) = r.

== Example ==
The classic Divide and choose algorithm, for cutting a cake between two children, can be done using four queries.

- Ask Alice an Eval(0,1) query; let V_{1} be the answer (this is Alice's value of the entire cake).
- Ask Alice a Mark(0, V_{1} / 2) query; let x_{1} be the answer (this is Alice's mark which yields two pieces equal in her eyes).
- Ask George an Eval(0, x_{1}) and an Eval(x_{1}, 1) queries.
- If the former value is larger, give (0,x_{1}) to George and (x_{1},1) to Alice; else, give (0,x_{1}) to Alice and (x_{1},1) to George.

== Results ==
Besides divide-and-choose, many cake-cutting algorithms can be performed using RW queries whose number is polynomial in n (the number of agents). For example: Last diminisher can be done by O(n^{2}) RW queries and Even–Paz protocol can be done by O(n log n) RW queries. In parallel, there are many hardness results, proving that certain fair division problems require many RW queries to complete. Some such hardness results are shown below.

Proportional cake-cutting requires Ω(n log n) RW queries when either

- the pieces must be connected, or
- the protocol is deterministic, or
- the precision of cutting the cake is finite.
- The only protocol which uses O(n) RW queries is a randomized protocol, which can return disconnected pieces, and the allocation might be only fractionally-proportional.

Proportional cake-cutting with different entitlements requires at least Ω(n log(D)) RW queries, where D is the common denominator of the entitlements (in particular, it cannot be found using a bounded number of queries if the entitlements are irrational). There is an algorithm that uses O(n log(D)) RW queries for rational entitlements, and a finite algorithm for irrational entitlements.

Envy-free cake-cutting requires

- Ω(n^{2}) RW queries when the pieces may be disconnected,
- Infintiely many queries when the pieces must be connected and there are at least 3 agents. In other words, there is no algorithm that always finds an envy-free allocation among 3 or more agents using finitely-many RW queries.
- For any ε > 0, an ε-envy-free connected cake-cutting requires at least Ω(log ε^{−1}) queries. For 3 agents, an O(log ε^{−1}) protocol exists. For 4 agents, an O(poly(log ε^{−1})) protocol exists. For 5 or more agents, the best known protocol requires O(n ε^{−1}), which shows an exponential gap in the query complexity.

Equitable cake-cutting cannot be done using finitely-many RW queries even for 2 agents. Moreover, for any ε > 0:

- A connected ε-equitable cake-cutting requires at least Ω(log ε^{−1}) queries. For 2 agents, an O(log ε^{−1}) protocol exists. For 3 or more agents, the best known protocol requires O(n (log n + log ε^{−1})) queries.
- Even without connectivity, ε-equitable cake-cutting requires at least Ω(log ε^{−1} / log log ε^{−1} ) RW queries.

Exact cake-cutting (also known as perfect cake-cutting) cannot be done using finitely-many RW queries even for 2 agents. Moreover, for any ε > 0:

- An ε-perfect cake-cutting with the minimum possible number of cuts requires at least Ω(log ε^{−1}) queries. For 2 agents, an O(log ε^{−1}) protocol exists. For 3 or more agents, the best known protocol requires O(n^{3} ε^{−1}) queries.

Maximin share cake-cutting, when the pieces must be separated by a positive distance, cannot be done using finitely-many RW queries. Moreover, even for a single agent, there is no algorithm that computes the agent's maximin-share using finitely-many RW queries. However:

- For any ε > 0, it is possible to compute a value between the MMS and the MMS-ε using O(n log ε^{−1}) RW queries.
- When the cake is circular (i.e., in fair pie-cutting), it is possible to compute a value between the MMS and the MMS-ε using O(n ε^{−1}) RW queries. It is open whether O(n log ε^{−1}) RW queries suffice.

Average-proportional cake-cutting (i.e., an allocation between n families, such that for each family, the average value is at least 1/n of the total) cannot be computed using finitely-many RW queries, even when there are 2 families with 2 members in each family. The proof is by reduction from equitable cake-cutting.

== Variants ==
=== Left-mark and right-mark ===
When the value measure of an agent is not strictly positive (i.e., there are parts that the agent values at 0), a mark query can, in principle, return infinitely many values. For example, if an agent values [0,0.9] at 1 and [0.9,1] at 0, then the query Mark(0,1) can return any value between 0.9 and 1. Some algorithms require a more specific value:

- The left-mark query, LeftMark(x,r), returns the leftmost (smallest) y such that v_{i} ([x,y]) = r;
- The right-mark query, RightMark(x,r), returns the rightmost (largest) y such that v_{i} ([x,y]) = r;

If only one of these two variants is given (in addition to the Eval query), the other variant cannot be computed in finite time.

=== Two-dimensional cakes ===
The RW query model has been generalized to two-dimensional cakes and multi-dimensional cakes.

== Alternative models ==
There are many cake-cutting algorithms that do not use the RW model. They usually use one of the following models.

=== Direct revelation model ===
Algorithms for restricted classes of valuations, such as piecewise-linear, piecewise-constant or piecewise-uniform, which can be given explicitly as input to the algorithm. Some such algorithms were developed for truthful cake-cutting.

=== Moving-knife model ===
In this model, there are knives moving continuously along the cake (see moving-knife procedures). This model is related to the RW model as follows: any moving-knife procedure with a fixed number of agents and a fixed number of knives can be simulated using O(log ε^{−1}) RW queries.

=== Simultaneous queries model ===
In this model, agents simultaneously send discretizations of their preferences. A discretization is a sequence of cut-points, and the values of pieces between these cut-points (for example: a protocol for two agents might require each agent to report a sequence of three cut-points (0,x,1) where the values of (0,x) and (x,1) are 1/2). These reports are used to compute a fair allocation. The complexity of an algorithm in this model is defined as the maximum number of intervals in a required discretization (so the complexity of the above protocol is 2).

One advantage of this model over the RW model is that it enables to elicit preferences in parallel. This allows to compute a proportional cake-cutting in time O(n) by simultaneously asking each agent for a discretization with n intervals (of equal value). In contrast, in the RW model there is an O(n log n) lower bound. On the other hand, in the simultaneous model, it is impossible to compute an envy-free cake-cutting using a finite discretization for 3 or more agents; but for every e>0, there exists a simultaneous protocol with complexity O(n/e^{2}), that attains an e-approximate envy-free division.

== See also ==
- Demand oracle (and value oracle) - a similar query model in a setting with indivisible objects.
