= Chors =

Chors may refer to:

- Chors (deity), or Khors, a Slavic god
- Chors Rural District, in Iran
  - Chors, Iran, a village
- Chors Patera, a volcanic feature on Io

== See also ==
- Chor (disambiguation)
- Chores (disambiguation)
