= Choré =

Choré may refer to

== Locations ==
- Choré District, Paraguay
- Choré River, Bolivia

== Other ==
- Club Choré Central, a Paraguayan football club
