= Al Khawr =

Al Khawr, also spelled Al Khor, may refer to:

- Al Khor, a town located in northern Qatar
- Al Khor Municipality, the municipality in which Al Khor town is located in
- Al Khawr, Iran
- Al Khawr, Yemen

== See also ==
- Khor (disambiguation)
