= Free disposal =

Economics concept

In various parts of economics, the term free disposal implies that resources can be discarded without any cost.

The term is usually employed to refer to situations that do not have free disposal.

For example, the Electricity market does not have free disposal, as stopping the production of large plants can be very expensive. This creates the phenomenon of Negative pricing, where it is more economical for plant operators to pay electricity consumers for disposing of the excess energy than it would be to stop generation and start it again when demand is higher.

There also exists situations that do have free disposal, for example a fair division setting with free disposal is a setting where some resources have to be divided fairly, but some of the resources may be left undivided, discarded or donated.

Examples of situations with free disposal are allocation of food, clothes jewels etc. Examples of situations without free disposal are:

- Chore division - since all chores must be done.
- Allocation of land with an old structure - since the structure may have to be destructed, and destruction is costly.
- Allocation of an old car - since the car may have to be carried away to used cars garage, and moving it may be costly.
- Allocation of shares in a firm that may have debts - since the firm cannot be disposed of without paying its debts first.

The free disposal assumption may be useful for several reasons:

- It enables truthful cake-cutting algorithms: The option to discard some of the cake gives the players an incentive to reveal their true valuations.
- It enables fast envy-free cake-cutting algorithms, and more economically-efficient envy-free allocations: Discarding some of the cake helps to reduce envy.
- It enables online assignment algorithms.
