= Choron =

Choron may refer to:

- Choron string drum from the middle ages
- Choroń, village in Poland
- Choron (dance)
- Professeur Choron, French writer and publisher
- Alexandre-Étienne Choron, French musician
- Alexandre Étienne Choron, French chef and inventor of
  - Choron sauce
