= Biochore =

A biochore is a subdivision of the biosphere consisting of biotopes that resemble one another and thus are colonized by similar biota. Biochores provide some information regarding past environmental conditions and evolutionary processes. Biochore's have fluid descriptions that can change in range and composition over time due to mass extinction events, major geotectonic shifts, and eustatic changes. Biochore names are geographic, not taxonomic, to emphasize the environmental aspect over the organisms the biochore contains.

== Setting ==
The physical area of a biochore may vary widely depending on when it was described or biota content it contains. Some areas may even need multiple biochore descriptions or may need to change descriptions due to biochores changing beyond the acceptable limits of variation. This may be caused by mass extinction events, major geotectonic shifts, and eustatic changes. Biochores are named based on the climate and geography of the region. The climatobiogeographic method has been used to map the distribution of life in relation to climatic zones. Examples of biochore classifications include grasslands, forests, deserts, etc.

== Characteristics ==
Biochores are characterized according to its distinctive ecosystem it contains and it depends on the era and location. Their proximity to ancient lakes, oceans, or deserts further defines their ecological dynamics. The defining characteristics of a biochore are largely determined by the fossil record, revealing the types of plants and animals that thrived in these past environments.

== Conservation and Threats ==
The main threats to biochores come from loss of critical paleontological sites due to deforestation, pollution, mining, and other human activities that may destroy fossil records before they can be studied. Conservation efforts should be aimed towards protecting these paleontological sites that provide insight into the Earth's past.
