= Khor (disambiguation) =

Khor may refer to:

- Al Khor, a town in Qatar
- Khor, an ancient region in Syria
- Khor, Jawad, a village in India
- Khor (river), a river in Russia
- Khor, the fictional currency of Syldavia

== See also ==
- Al Khawr (disambiguation)
