= Choré River =

River in Bolivia

Coordinates: 16°25′S 64°41′W

Choré River (Spanish: Río Choré) is a river in Santa Cruz Department, in eastern Bolivia.
