= Stromquist moving-knives procedure =

Envy-free solution to the cake-cutting problem

The Stromquist moving-knives procedure is a procedure for envy-free cake-cutting among three players. It is named after Walter Stromquist who presented it in 1980.

This procedure was the first envy-free moving knife procedure devised for three players. It requires four knives but only two cuts, so each player receives a single connected piece. There is no natural generalization to more than three players which divides the cake without extra cuts. The resulting partition is not necessarily efficient.

== Simpler version ==
In a simpler version of the problem, a division is regarded as "fair" if all people ("players") are satisfied that each has received at least 1/ n (here n = 3) of the cake. For this version, there is a simple and practical solution, attributed by Steinhaus to Banach and Knaster.

=== Procedure for ther simpler version ===
Stromquist moving-knife procedure when cake is cut

A referee moves a sword from left to right over the cake, hypothetically dividing it into small left piece and a large right piece. Each player moves a knife over the right piece, always keeping it parallel to the sword. The players must move their knives in a continuous manner, without making any "jumps". When any player shouts "cut", the cake is cut by the sword and by whichever of the players' knives happens to be the central one of the three (that is, the second in order from the sword). Then the cake is divided in the following way:

- The piece to the left of the sword, which we denote Left, is given to the player who first shouted "cut". We call this player the "shouter" and the other two players the "quieters".
- The piece between the sword and the central knife, which we denote Middle, is given to the remaining player whose knife is closest to the sword.
- The remaining piece, Right, is given to the third player.

=== Strategy ===
Each player can act in a way that guarantees that—according to their own measure—they receive at least one-third of the cake

- Always hold your knife such that it divides the part to the right of the sword to two pieces that are equal in your eyes (hence, your knife initially divides the entire cake to two equal parts and then moves rightwards as the sword moves rightwards).
- Shout 'cut' when Left becomes equal to the piece you are about to receive if you remain quiet (i.e. if your knife is leftmost, shout 'cut' if Left=Middle; if your knife is rightmost, shout if Left=Right; if your knife is central, shout 'cut' if Left=Middle=Right).

=== Analysis ===
We now prove that any player using the above strategy receives at least one-third share of the cake

First, consider the shouter. She shouts, when in her eyes, Left = Middle = Right. Thus, the piece she receives, is exactly one-third of the cake as per her.

Now consider the two quieters. Since they remained quiet, they don't envy the shouter i.e. the piece the remaining cake (after giving away the Left piece) is larger than two thirds of the cake.

Now since they divide the remaining cake into 2 equal pieces, each of the pieces is equal to or more than one third of the cake, as per their respective valuations.

The piece they receive, necessarily contains their knives, i.e. it is equal to or larger than the piece they would have cut, which was anyways equal to or larger than one-third of the cake.

Hence, each agent receives at least one-third of the cake as per their respective valuations

Ties can be broken arbitrarily and the same analysis shall hold.

== Dividing a 'bad' cake ==
The moving-knives procedure can be adapted for chore division - dividing a cake with a negative value.

== See also ==
- The Fair pie-cutting procedure provides a simpler solution to the same problem, using only 3 rotating knives, when the cake is a 1-dimensional circle ("pie"),
- The Robertson–Webb rotating-knife procedure provides an even simpler solution, using only 1 rotating knife, when the cake is 2-dimensional.
- Moving-knife procedure
- Martin Gardner descnbes the case n = 3 (simpler version) in his book
