= Moving-knife procedure =

Solution to the fair division problem

In the mathematics of social science, and especially game theory, a moving-knife procedure is a type of solution to the fair division problem. "Fair division" is the problem in game theory of dividing a set of resources among several people who have an entitlement to them so that each person receives their due share. The central tenet of fair division is that such a division should be performed by the players themselves, without the need for external arbitration, as only the players themselves really know how they value the goods. The name of the procedure comes from the canonical example of the fair division of a cake using a knife.

== Examples ==
The canonical example is the division of a cake using a knife.

The simplest example is a moving-knife equivalent of the "I cut, you choose" scheme, first described by A.K.Austin as a prelude to his own procedure:

- One player moves the knife across the cake, conventionally from left to right.
- The cake is cut when either player calls "stop", when he or she perceives the knife to be at the 50-50 point.
- If stop is called, the player to call stop gets the left-hand side of the cake. This will produce an envy-free division if the caller gets the left piece and the other player gets the right piece.

This procedure is not necessarily efficient. Generalizing this scheme to more than two players cannot be done by a discrete procedure without sacrificing envy-freeness.

Other examples of moving-knife procedures include

- The Stromquist moving-knives procedure
- The Austin moving-knife procedures
- The Levmore–Cook moving-knives procedure
- The Robertson–Webb rotating-knife procedure
- The Dubins–Spanier moving-knife procedure

== See also ==
- Divide and choose
- Envy-free cake-cutting
- Fair cake-cutting
