= Participatory budgeting by country =

As of 2015, over 1,500 instances of participatory budgeting (PB) have been implemented across the five continents. While the democratic spirit of PB remains the same throughout the world, institutional variations abound.

For example, the Dominican Republic, Bolivia, Guatemala, Nicaragua, and Peru have implemented participatory budgeting in all local governments, and a number of towns and cities in Portugal, France, Italy, Germany, and Spain have also initiated participatory budgeting processes. In Canada, participatory budgeting has been implemented with public housing, neighbourhood groups, and public schools, in the cities of Toronto, Guelph, Hamilton, and West Vancouver. Since its emergence in Porto Alegre, participatory budgeting has spread to hundreds of Latin American cities, and dozens of cities in Europe, Asia, Africa, and North America. In some cities, participatory budgeting has been applied for school, university, and public housing budgets. In France, the Region Poitou-Charentes is notable for launching participatory budgeting in its secondary schools. These international approaches differ significantly, and they are shaped as much by their local contexts as by the Porto Alegre model.

== Latin America ==
=== Brazil ===
Participatory budgeting in Porto Alegre occurs annually, starting with a series of neighborhood, regional, and citywide assemblies, where residents and elected budget delegates identify spending priorities and vote on which priorities to implement. Porto Alegre spends about 200 million dollars per year on construction and services, this money is subject to participatory budgeting. Annual spending on fixed expenses, such as debt service and pensions, is not subject to public participation. Around fifty thousand residents of Porto Alegre now take part in the participatory budgeting process (compared to 1.5 million city inhabitants), with the number of participants growing year on year since 1989. Participants are from diverse economic and political backgrounds.

The participatory budgeting cycle starts in January and assemblies across the city facilitate maximum participation and interaction. Each February there is instruction from city specialists in technical and system aspects of city budgeting. In March there are plenary assemblies in each of the city's 16 districts as well as assemblies dealing with such areas as transportation, health, education, sports, and economic development. These large meetings—with participation that can reach over 1,000—elect delegates to represent specific neighborhoods. The mayor and staff attend to respond to citizen concerns. In the following months, delegates meet weekly or biweekly in each district to review technical project criteria and district needs. City department staff may participate according to their area of expertise. At a second regional plenary, regional delegates prioritize the district's demands and elect 42 councillors representing all districts and thematic areas to serve on the Municipal Council of the Budget. The main function of the Municipal Council of the Budget is to reconcile the demands of each district with available resources, and to propose and approve an overall municipal budget. The resulting budget is binding, though the city council can suggest, but not require changes. Only the Mayor may veto the budget, or remand it back to the Municipal Council of the Budget (this has never happened).

=== Argentina ===
==== Rosario ====
The city of Rosario in Argentina began using participatory budgeting in 2002. Notably, the municipality has aimed for gender parity in the participatory budgeting process and has sought to make all participants more sensitive of gender issues and the impact of the participatory budgeting projects on these issues.

==== Buenos Aires ====
Buenos Aires adopted the PB process in 2001 hoping to emerge a political economy. There were manipulators like people watching the system and third parties forming for or against the PB system. Buenos aires used a system where the communities allocated where the government would take action first by ranking where the cities resources would go. After participation decreased by 50% in the 2005 cycle, PB came to an end and "the new communes" emerged.

== Europe ==
=== Finland ===
The City of Helsinki started its citizen budget process in 2018. The first round was conducted in 2019. The OmaStadi-process ("MyOwnHelsinki") consists of four stages: First, citizens make proposals in the areas of ecology, culture, outdoors, nature, built environment and community. In the second stage, the city administration adapts the proposals to the city's standards and equips them with a budget. Third, citizens allocate the available budget according to their personal preferences in a vote. Finally, the city implements the most highly ranked proposals in consultation with the original initiators as far as the budget suffices.

In 2021, a citizen budget of €8.8 Mio. is allocated through the OmaStadi-process. This equals about 0.2 percent of the city's budget (€5000 Mio. in 2021). 1.8 Mio Euro are spend on measures concerning the whole city, €7 Mio. are distributed on the district level. Citizens can vote on both levels. Every Helsinki citizen aged at least 12 years can participate. Voting takes place through a personalised internet access. People with difficulties using the internet can turn to help points, e.g. at local libraries.

The City of Turku spends €1 Mio. on its citizen's budget for 2020. About 3000 citizens participated and voted for 52 projects out of 239 proposals. The City of Tampere started its first participatory budget in 2020. A sum of €0.45 Mio. is focussed on supporting children's and youth's urban environment. The City of Lahti devotes a budget of €200,000 for the year 2022. The City of Vantaa spends a budget of €50,000 for the year 2021. The budget focuses on city districts. The City of Oulu spends a budget of €50,000 for the year 2021.

=== Hungary ===
Participatory budgeting was introduced in Hungary after 2019, the effort mainly spearheaded by the Two-Tailed Dog Party. The largest participatory budget is organized in the capital Budapest, in addition to the PB initiatives to several capital districts and some municipalities.

==== Budapest ====
In Budapest, the first year of (capital-wide) participatory budgeting started in 2019 (részvételi költségvetés), subsequently it was rebranded as 'community budgeting' (közösségi költségvetés). The yearly budget on the capital level is 1 billion HUF (about 2500 thousand euros). The final stage is always a direct vote, which is preceded by idea submission and filtering rounds (which originally included a citizens assembly stage). The minimum age for voting is 14 and balloting is possible online (accounting for a large majority of votes) and in person.

=== Iceland ===
The Better Neighbourhoods participatory budgeting project of the wider citizen sourcing Better Reykjavik project of the City of Reykjavik was established in 2011. Nearly 2 million Euros (300 million ISK) has been allocated each year with over citizen proposed 100 projects funded most years. The project is mostly driven by digital participation with secure electronic voting.

=== Latvia ===
Latvian capital Rīga first introduced participatory budgeting project in 2019, and continues to hold an annual knapsack vote to determine projects to be carried out. As of 2025, EUR 250,000 per project is allocated to infrastructure projects, EUR 250,000 per project to courtyards and EUR 50,000 per project to social innovation or non-material projects.

In 2025, Mārupe municipality held its first participatory budgeting project.

=== Poland ===
==== Wieliczka ====
Wieliczka is a Polish town with about 26,000 residents. In 2023 it initiated a PB process using a novel aggregation rule, the method of equal shares, which aims to guarantee justified representation to all groups in the population. The program was called the Zielony Milion – Green Million, as the total allocated budget was 1,000,000 PLN, and the focus was on environmental projects. The project timeline was:

- 3.3.2023: information and education campaign.
- 8.3 - 25.3: submissions of project proposals. At this step, 89 proposals were submitted.
- 25.3 - 31.3: verification of submitted projects. At this step, 25 proposals were rejected and 64 proposals were retained.
- 31.3: the retained projects were presented to the public. The projects were presented both in text (explaining the project details) and on a map.
- 3.4 - 22.4: the public could vote on the projects that they support. The voting format was approval ballot. 6586 residents participated in the voting, of whom:
  - 3582 women and 3004 men;
  - 28% under 30, 37% between 31 and 45, 19% between 46 and 60, and 16% above 30.
  - 3328 voted for one project only; 1456 voted for two projects; 553 voter for 3 projects, etc.; 91 voted for 14 or more projects.
- 26.4: the results were announced: 30 projects won. The computation used the method of equal shares, and a detailed technical report was published, to show to process of computation.
  - Examples of winning projects include: purchasing 10 photo-traps against garbage-trucks and wild landfills (5000 PLN); revitalization of green areas in Choragwica by planting (100,000 PLN); Creation of recreational conditions for the inhabitants of Węgrzce Wielkie (85,000 PLN); installing breeding booths for birds (600 PLN).

Afterwards, a survey was conducted, asking people whether they prefer the new aggregation rule to the more common rule of approval voting, and what ballot format they prefer.

=== Romania ===
==== Cluj-Napoca ====
Cluj-Napoca has implemented a pilot project in 2013, limited to one of its districts, followed by 2 Youth Participatory Budgeting experiments in 2015 and 2016.

In July 2017 the city launched an online PB platform (bugetareparticipativa.ro), voting being restricted by geolocation – to users located within Cluj-Napoca. Projects were to be proposed by residents, following some specific areas:

The project proposals must target specific areas such as walks, sidewalks and pedestrian areas, mobility, accessibility and traffic safety, green areas and playgrounds, arrangement of public spaces (urban furniture, public lightning), educational and cultural infrastructure, and “the digital city.”

Each year, the top 15 most voted projects can each receive a budget of maximum €150,000

=== Spain ===
Participatory budgeting projects in Spain accelerated in the early 2000s, typically as a result of left-wing party advocacy. Left-wing municipal governments established participatory budgeting exercises in "Sevilla, Albacete, San Sebastián, Getafe, Leganés, Sabadell, Leganés, Segovia, Torrellano, Elche, Algeciras [and] Novelda." Other municipalities that have implemented participatory budgeting at some point include "Puente Genil, Cabezas de San Juan and Rubi." As one of the first participatory budgeting experiments in Europe, participatory budgeting in Córdoba was influenced by other participatory exercises and originated from resistance to the Franco dictatorship in the 1970s and the experience in Porto Alegre, Brazil.

Although participatory budgeting experiments across Spain seemed to provide deliberate spaces for participation of citizens, Ganuza and Francés (2014) suggest that these experiments decreased in number through 2010 because municipal governments did not change their decision-making processes to accommodate greater citizen involvement. For example, the experiment in Córdoba was pushed by the municipal government and associations and only impacted up to 5% of the municipal budget. Pineda Nebot (2009) elaborates that local governments across Spain struggle to coordinate between citizens who recommend specific spending priorities and the bureaucracy that implements the budget.

In more recent times, participatory budgeting has resurged and expanded to some major cities, including Barcelona and Madrid. After left-wing parties won the Madrid municipal elections in 2015, a participatory budgeting experiment began, but the practice has faced problems with clear communication, transparency, and utilization of latest technology. For example, Pineda Nebot and Pires (2017) believe that many of the experiments in Spain do not provide sufficient information about previous budgets or space for citizens to design the rules of debate to have better deliberations, though they suggest that adopting technological innovations could improve the process. In the other hand, Ganuza and Francés (2014) and Sintomer et al. (2008) believe that some Spanish experiments of participatory budgeting are successful at creating deliberative spaces compared to in other parts of Europe since Spanish citizens tend to have a greater role in deciding the municipal budget. Looking at municipalities in the province of Barcelona, Parés (2011) agrees with previous research that find that participatory budgeting in Spanish municipalities with smaller populations have been more successful.

=== United Kingdom ===
PB in the United Kingdom was initially introduced as part of the 'New Labour' Party's decentralization agenda that aimed to empower the local governments in the first decade of the 21st century. Hazel Blears, the Labour MP, "[...] played a key role in the inclusion of PB on the national policy agenda[...]," pushing for greater community participation and empowerment in the governmental structure. Within this new political ambiance, the British PB, inspired by Porto Alegre's example, gained traction for implementation, especially through the active engagement of local NGO's and community activists, namely the Community Pride Initiative.

The first attempt at PB was initiated as a pilot in the city of Bradford in 2004, and its "procedural model consists of two main steps: the elaboration of project schemes by local community groups and a decision about these schemes by all involved groups during a public meeting." The Bradford process, while limited to small funding, helped PB spread to other cities such as Newcastle. In addition to the bottom-up activism in local communities, Blears's initiative for PB on the national level helped promote its implementation and diffusion more broadly, and by 2011, there were at least 150 recorded cases of PB, albeit being limited to small funding and designated personnel. The "UK style" of PB, as Anja Rocke puts it, "in form of small grant-spending processes with no secured financial basis and organized at the margins of the political system," failed to gain enough momentum to be established nationally as a formal decision-making procedure.

==== Scotland ====
The Scottish Government has made a commitment to participatory budgeting, saying "We support PB as a tool for community engagement and for developing participatory democracy in Scotland". In addition, the Scottish Government and the Convention of Scottish Local Authorities have agreed that at least 1% of local government budgets will be subject to participatory budgeting by the end of 2021, potentially amounting to £100million.

The Scottish Government allocates funding for participatory budgeting through the Community Choices Fund, delivered in partnership between the Government, local authorities, communities and third sector organisations.

Scottish Government Community Choices fund
| Year | Funds allocated |
|---|---|
| 2016–2017 | £1.5 million |
| 2017–2018 | £2 million |

==== Support and tools ====
There is a national network to support participatory budgeting called the PB Scotland Network. Glasgow Community Planning Partnership has worked with What Works Scotland to develop a toolkit to assess the impact of its PB activities and develop an improvement plan.

==== Review and evaluation ====
A number of analyses and reviews of participatory budgeting in Scotland have been published since 2015, including:

Participatory budgeting in Scotland: an overview of strategic design choices and principles for effective delivery. Produced by What Works Scotland and the Glasgow Centre for Population Health, this reviewed international research, evaluations, grey literature and commentary and drew upon learning and insights from a PB pilot in Govanhill in Glasgow. (Published December 2015).

A Review of First Generation Participatory Budgeting in Scotland. This examined the growth and development of the first generation of participatory budgeting in Scotland in order to generate insight to support the strategic and operational leadership and delivery of future participatory budgeting. The review was commissioned by What Works Scotland and was undertaken by researchers from the Glasgow Centre for Population Health and What Works Scotland. (Published October 2016).

Public service reform and participatory budgeting: How can Scotland learn from international evidence? A documentary film exploring how Glasgow and Fife community planning partnerships learnt about implementing participatory budgeting on a study trip to Paris, a European leader in mainstreaming PB. (Published July 2017)

Evaluating Participatory Budgeting Activity in Scotland – Interim Report Year 2. Produced by researchers based at Glasgow Caledonian University for the Scottish Government. It identified any impact that PB has had on local communities, local services, and local democracy in Scotland across 20 local authority areas with a more detailed analysis of 6 local authorities.(Published Nov 2017).

== United States of America & Canada ==
The first recorded Participatory Budgeting process in the United States of America started in 2009 in the Rogers Park neighborhood of Chicago, Illinois. Led by the ward's Alderman, Joe Moore, Chicago's 49th Ward is undertaking this process with the Alderman's "Menu Money." Menu Money is a yearly budgeted amount each of Chicago's 50 wards receives for use on capital expenses. This money in other wards is typically allocated at the complete discretion of a ward's Alderman. Since 2011 more examples have been occurring in the US, in New York City, and now citywide in Vallejo, California, and most recently in Greensboro, NC. In Boston, the first youth-led participatory budgeting process in the US allows teens to decide how to spend $1 million of the city's budget.

=== Municipal Processes ===
==== Cambridge, Massachusetts ====
Cambridge's first PB occurred in 2014–2015, with $528,000 allocated towards the implementation of six winning projects. Winning projects included one hundred healthy trees, twenty laptops for a community center, bilingual books for children learning English, a public bathroom in Central Square, bike report stations, and free public wifi in six outdoor locations.

==== New York City ====
New York City's Participatory Budgeting process (PBNYC) is the largest in North America. The process began in 2011–2012 as a pilot program in four City Council districts. By its eleventh year (2021–2022), PBNYC had grown to include 30 of the city's 51 districts. Community members in each district decide how to spend at least $1 million of their City Council member's discretionary funds.

PBNYC cycles run from early fall through the spring. Districts hold neighborhood meetings to collect ideas for community improvement projects. Idea collection is focused particularly on hard-to-reach communities, such as immigrants with limited English proficiency, youth, senior citizens, and public housing residents. Volunteers then research community needs and work with city agencies to turn ideas into concrete proposals. The proposals are put to a community vote, which is open to any resident of the district over the age of 14. City agencies implement the winning projects. In the 2014-2015 cycle, 23% of participants either had felony convictions or were under the age of 18; over 25% were not born in the U.S.; almost half earned under $50,000 per year; and 57% identified as people of color.

A voter-approved amendment to the New York City Charter in November 2018 created a new Civic Engagement Commission (CEC) which was charged with designing and implementing a citywide Participatory Budgeting process to start in 2020. This commission extends participatory budgeting beyond the budgetary constraints of the City Council, centralizing coordination and drawing resources from mayoral expense funding instead of discretionary capital funds committed by individual City Council members. The CEC has also implemented other civic engagement initiatives, including a mobile community center and poll site interpretation services.

Before receiving funding for a citywide process, the CEC first ran two localized processes. First was "It's Our Money" in 2019, which distributed $100,000 to five youth-focused projects submitted by organizations serving young people. Winners were voted on by youth between ages 9–24, out of fifty total project submissions. Second was "The People's Money" in 2021, which allowed residents of the 33 neighborhoods hit hardest by COVID-19 to vote on how to distribute $1.3 million for local projects.

The most recent iteration of citywide participatory budgeting is also called "The People's Money". As of January 2026, the process is in the Assembly phase of its 4th year. Its annual budget is determined by the mayor. It currently has 4 million dollars allocated by the Adams Administration to fund local programs and service projects across the city. In the first phase of the current cycle, idea generation, 473 workshops were held for residents across the city, over 10,000 people were engaged, and over 2,000 ideas were collected. In the Assembly phase, 25 randomly selected residents in each borough will determine which projects end up on the final ballot. Once finalized, all NYC residents age 11 and older will be able to vote on which proposals receive funding, to implement winning projects starting in fall 2026.

Mayor Zohran Mamdani established the Office of Mass Engagement under which the Civic Engagement Commission sits.

=== Housing Complex Processes ===
==== Toronto (Canada) ====
In Toronto Community Housing, PB is part of a broader "tenant participation system." PB has been a part of Toronto Community Housing since 2001. This inspired the launch of a three-year pilot of PB at the ward-level in Toronto, beginning in 2015. In the months of May and June 2018 the city will begin debating what to do with PB at the municipal-level, following annual evaluations of the pilot. Thirty-seven projects have been voted for through the entirety of the three-year pilot process, comprising a total of $1.8 million in residents directly allocating funds towards projects.

==== New York City ====
Citing the case of Toronto, Community Voices Heard (CVH) has called for PB within the New York City Housing Authority (NYCHA). As part of a platform for democratizing and improving access to public housing, CVH has advocated for developing a kind of participatory system tied together by PB. CVH also advocates for a gradual increase of money being allocated through PB as residents become increasingly familiarized with the process. In 2015, then-Council Speaker Melissa Mark-Viverito also publicly called for PB to be established in NYCHA.

==== Los Angeles ====
As part of a broader platform for pushing greater investment and public housing, in early 2014 the LA Human Right to Housing collective began advocating for the use of PB in the Housing Authority of the City of Los Angeles (HACLA). This was in response to a budget corruption scandal in November 2012 in HACLA. According to the Collective, nearly one-hundred residents mobilized to demand PB at a HACLA Agency Plan hearing in August 2014. In response, HACLA launched a "values driven participatory budgeting process" developed and coordinated by a consultant. This was a six-week process, consisting of "resident consultation" that fed into decisions ultimately made by administration and management. Participatory elements of the process were "a resident survey" and "resident review of site specific budgets." The Collective regarded both the design and distribution of the survey to be unsatisfactory. Coupled with a lack of technical support, any kind of resident-focused collective deliberation or evidence of resident influence on the outcome of the process, the Collective deemed the process "participatory in name only."

To counter this, the Collective sought to scale up their campaign for a "true participatory budgeting" process by initiating a Model PB process. The process included a combination of one-on-one and door-to-door outreach with deliberation through meetings and assemblies of residents. The Model PB process resulted in tenants and the Collective deepening their critique of HACLA's PB "in name only" as well as putting forward a number of recommendations to create a "true PB" process.

=== Youth, School, and College Processes ===
==== Greater Boston Area ====
Since 2014 a youth PB process has operated in the city of Boston. Today the process allows persons aged between 12 and 25 years old to decide how to allocate one million dollars.

In 2013–2014 MIT's International Development Group within the school's Department of Urban Studies and Planning conducted an $8,000 PB process. Voting was not over allocating money to specific project proposals, but rather to determining exact allotments to four broad distinct budget categories: field trips, social events, project funding, and cultural event series. To determine precise allotments, "each participant allocated a percentage value of the $8,000 to each category. The average for each category was taken and a preliminary set of results was disclosed." The MIT intra-departmental process provides an example of how PB can be utilized to not only determine the allocation of funds within a specific budget category, but also to determine how funds are distributed across budget categories.

==== Chicago ====
In Spring 2015 Sullivan High School conducted a $25,000 participatory budgeting process. Seventy percent of the student body voted in the process, with the money allocated towards building a new recreation room.

==== New York ====
Within PBNYC youth participation has been semi-formalized in various forms. This includes the youth-led formation of the District 39 PB Youth Committee. District 3 also possesses a PB Youth Committee December 2015, which works in collaboration with an organization called Friends of the High Line. In his State of the City address, Mayor Bill de Blasio announced that PB would be launched in every public high school. Each participating school will receive $2,000 for students to allocate through PB. PB has also been launched at various colleges in the City University of New York. These have included Queens College, Brooklyn College, City Tech, Hunter College, and the CUNY Graduate Center.

==== Phoenix ====
Ten high schools allocated $55,000 of district-wide funds in Phoenix through PB.

==== San Antonio ====
In 2013 a $25,000 PB process was launched at Palo Alto Community College. Initially this was only open to faculty and staff. In fall 2015 the process was opened to students as well. The 2018 process expanded the pot of funds from $25,000 to $50,000.

== Africa ==
=== South Africa ===
For South Africa, the mechanisms for citizen participation is written in its constitution. Each municipality has its budgetary committee formed with representatives from its 'wards' that deal directly with its budgeting. The World Bank Group's research lists Mangaung and Ekurhuleni municipalities as representative cases to demonstrate the typical PB process in South Africa. First, the process for the council is fixed by the mayor, who sets up certain deadlines for the council to deliberate within. Then, the municipality is divided geographically into 'wards', and the public budget is drawn with any desired submission from the community through their ward representatives. The tentatively accumulated budget plan is then publicized so that any citizens or "stakeholders" can make their final inputs, and the final version is submitted to the national and provincial governments for approval.

On a nationwide level, the South African municipalities, as a result of PB, have witnessed the public budget "shift from infrastructure development to local economic development, a higher priority for citizens." Currently, PB is being carried out in 284 municipalities, each varying slightly in its process. The rate of transparency for the municipal governments has increased because the sub-organization ward committees are able to maintain consistently ongoing communication with the citizens. Regardless, the challenges in South African local governance still prevail as a result of the lack of resources and limited capacities assigned to PB. Furthermore, language barriers and cultural differences also provide immediate obstacles for holistic communications between various wards and social groups within the municipalities.

== Asia ==
=== Republic of Korea ===
In 2005, the national government revised its Local Finance Act to promote citizen participation in the local government budgeting process in response to a few of the local governments that initially took a bottom-up approach in experimenting with forms of PB. Since then, the Ministry of Security and Public Administration invested in the nationwide promotion of PB system diffusion, and under Myung Bak Lee's Administration in 2011, the newly revised Local Finance Act required all local governments to adopt PB.

Before the 2011 decree, approximately 45% of local governments had already been utilizing the PB system, and it took 3 years for the remaining municipalities to fulfill the mandate. The PB System of Seoul Metropolitan Government served as the benchmark for other local governments' adoption of PB in those years. Seoul, city with the world's 4th highest GDP, runs a PB committee of 300 people representing 25 districts. The committee is then split into 11 different budgetary fields such as parks and recreation, culture, environment, etc. In its first year, Seoul citizens voted and finalized on 223 projects worth 50.3 billion KRW, and most recently in 2017, the PB system finalized 766 projects amounting to 59.3 billion KRW (approximately US$55 million).

A comprehensive study of Korea's PB in 2016 suggests that PB in Korea has allocated most of public budget to the following three areas: land/local development, transportation, and culture and tourism. Transparency in budget documents and information sharing has increased since 2011, and the approval rates by local PB committees averaged to approximately 70%. On the other hand, the study also points out that the lack of citizen capacity, inadequate resources for smaller municipalities, and limited representativeness of vested interests as some of the most unresolved challenges in Korea's PB implementation.

=== Finland ===
In addition to municipal participatory budgeting processes organized by individual cities (such as Helsinki’s OmaStadi), several Finnish municipalities use digital civic engagement and e-services platforms to support participatory budgeting. Many of these tools are integrated with national identity verification systems such as Suomi.fi.

A number of Finland’s 308 municipalities have implemented the Tagnile365 electronic civic engagement and service platform to facilitate participatory budgeting and other forms of public participation. The Tagnile365 system, often accessed via a municipality’s “e-services” portal, can combine idea submission, voting and interaction with municipal decision-making workflows. For example, the City of Hyvinkää uses its eHyvinkää electronic services portal for participatory budgeting and civic input, which requires user authentication through Suomi.fi. Tagnile365 supports both the administrative handling of participatory budgeting proposals and secure identification of participants.

=== India ===
India's experience with PB has been limited despite its 74th Constitutional Amendment, which proposes to the state and local governments the formation of ward committees composed of local citizens to direct ward-level budgets. Such initiative was not implemented, and thus there were only few cities that experimented with PB, namely Bangalore, Mysore, Pune, as well as the village Hiware Bazar.

Bangalore was the first to implement PB in India in 2001 with the help of a local NGO. Similarly, Pune was able to adopt PB in 2006 with the help of several local NGOs. Pune's PB system was met with a large response from its local citizens, and multiple online and offline workshops were carried out to foster the implementation As a result, Pune has experienced both increased citizen participation and budget allocation, which are directed primarily towards roads, electricity, slum-improvement, and water shortage. Influenced by Pune's PB, Pimpri-Chinchwad, the fifth-most populated city of Maharashtra, also began to adopt the framework in 2013.

Hiware Bazar, a village in Maharashtra, may have served as the most successful example of PB in India. On June 25, 2015, Delhi Deputy chief Minister Manish Sisodia presented the Swaraj Budget. The Aam Admi Party Swaraj Budget was prepared based on voting from the people of different constituencies. In each constituency three meetings were held; each meeting was attended by 200–300 residents, and a list of key issues was prepared, which was then voted on to decide the top priorities. As a result, the village, once bereft of water, education, and basic needs for life, is now self-sufficient with a high per capita income.

=== Israel ===
Tel Aviv conducts a participatory budgeting process since 1999. The city is divided into 58 neighborhoods. Each year, participatory budgeting is done in 12-20 neighborhoods. In each neighborhood, interested residents participate in planning workshops, in which projects for renovating the neighborhoods are suggested. The list of projects is put to a general vote among the residents. The single project with the highest number of votes is funded and carried out in the following year. If some budget remains, it is used to fund parts of the project with the second-highest number of votes.

== See also ==
- List of participatory budgeting votes
