= Participatory budgeting ballot types =

Participatory budgeting ballot types are the different ballot types (input formats) in participatory budgeting used for preference elicitation i.e. how each voter should express his or her preferences over the projects and how the budget should be allocated. Different cities use different ballot types (see list of participatory budgeting votes), and various experiments have been conducted to assess the advantages and disadvantages of each type.

== Common ballot types ==
Several input formats used in practice are:

- Ranked voting: each voter specifies an entire preference-relation over the projects, specifying the project that they consider the most valuable, the 2nd-most valuable, etc.
- Cardinal voting: each voter specifies a value for each project.
- Limited voting: each voter specifies a subset of their top k projects - the k projects that they consider to be the most valuable. Optionally, there may also be a lower bound on the number of projects approved (e.g. each voter must approve between 3 and 5 projects).
- Approval voting: each voter specifies a subset of the projects that they "approve" (consider as valuable), while the others are considered unapproved. This is like a binary scoring system in which each voter can score each project as either 1 or 0.
- Threshold approval voting: given a threshold-value t, each voter specifies the subset of all projects which they value as at least t.
- Cumulative voting: each voter receives a fixed number of points, and has to distribute these points among the projects.
- Quadratic voting: similar to cumulative voting, but the price of putting points on projects increases quadratically rather than linearly.

These input formats ignore the different costs of the projects. Some newer input formats, which do consider the costs, are:

- Knapsack voting: each voter specifies a subset of the projects, such that the total cost of the projects in the subset is at most the budget (regardless of how many projects are in the subset). Thus, each voter has to solve an individual knapsack problem - finding the subset which maximizes their personal utility under the budget constraint. An advantage of knapsack voting is that, if the algorithm scores each project by the number of votes it received, and chooses projects greedily in descending order of score, then knapsack voting is a partially truthful mechanism. Another advantage is that it encourages voters to be more aware to the costs of the projects they approve. A disadvantage is that it may put a high mental burden on the voters.
- Value-for-money ranking: each voter ranks the projects, not according to their total value, but according to their value/cost ratio.

A different input format, particularly suited for divisible PB, lets users report their entire ideal budget, that is, specify exactly how much money should be given to each project (see Budget-proposal aggregation).

== Comparison ==
The various input formats can be compared based in terms of implicit utilitarian voting – how much each input-format is useful in maximizing the sum of utilities. From this perspective, threshold approval voting is superior to knapsack voting, ranking-by-value and ranking-by-value-for-money: it minimizes the distortion from the maximum sum-of-utilities both theoretically and empirically.

Several other experiments have been done to compare ballot types (see Participatory budgeting experiments).

Goel, Krishnaswamy, Sakshuwong and Aitamurto report the results of several experiments done on real PB systems in Boston (2015–2016), Cambridge (2014–2015), Vallejo (2015) and New York City (2015). They compare knapsack voting to k-approval voting. Their main findings are:

1. Knapsack voting tends to favor cheaper projects, whereas k-approval favors more expensive projects. This is probably due to the fact that knapsack voting raises the voters' attention to the project costs.
2. The time it takes users to vote using the digital interface is not significantly different between the two methods; knapsack voting does not take more time.
3. Using pairwise comparisons of value-per-money, they conclude that knapsack voting allows voters to better represent their preferences.

Later experiments lead to different conclusions:

Benade, Itzhak, Shah, Procaccia and Gal compared input formats on two dimensions: efficiency (social welfare of the resulting outcomes), and usability (cognitive burden on the voters). They conducted an empirical study with over 1200 voters. Their story was about resource allocation for a desert island. They concluded that k-approval voting imposes low cognitive burden and is efficient, although it is not perceived as such by the voters.

Benade, Nath, Procaccia and Shah experimented with four input formats: knapsack voting, ranking by value, ranking by value-for-money, and threshold-approval. Their goal was to maximize social welfare by using observed votes as proxies for voters’ unknown underlying utilities. They found out that threshold-approval voting performs best on real PB data.

Fairstein, Benade and Gal report the results of an experiment with Amazon Turk workers, on a PB process in an imaginary town. In their experiment, 1800 participants vote in four PB elections in a controlled setting, to evaluate the practical effects of the choice of voting format and aggregation rule. They compared k-approval, threshold-approval, knapsack voting, rank by value, rank by value/cost, and cardinal ballots. Their main findings are that the k-approval voting format leads to the best user experience: users spent the least time learning the format and casting their votes, and found the format easiest to use. They felt that this format allowed them to express their preferences best, probably due to its simplicity.

Yang, Hausladen, Peters, Pournaras, Fricker and Helbing constructed an experiment modeled over the PB process in Zurich. They had 180 subjects that are students from Zurich universities. Each subject had to evaluate projects in six input formats: unrestricted approval, 5-approval, 5-approval with ranking, cumulative with 5 points, cumulative with 10 points, cumulative with 10 points over 5 projects. The subjects were then asked which input format was most easy, most expressive, and most suitable. Unrestricted approval was conceived most easy, but least expressive and least suitable; in contrast, 5-approval with ranking, and cumulative with 10 points over 5 projects, were found significantly more expressive and more suitable. Suitability was affected mainly by expressiveness; the effect of easiness was negligible. They also found out that the project ranking in unrestricted approval was significantly different than in the other 5 input formats. Approval voting encouraged voters to disperse their votes beyond their immediate self-interest. This may be considered as altruism, but it may also mean that this format does not represent their preferences well enough.
