= Participatory budgeting in Vallejo, California =

In 2013, the city of Vallejo, California, became the first municipality in the United States to adopt a wide participatory budgeting, a process in which citizens decide to vote where a portion of their tax money can be allocated. One of the goals of the participating budgeting is to make Government more transparent and create strong partnership and increase participation between citizens and local government leaders. The four main reasons the project was proposed. One is to improve the city's infrastructure and services, the second is to engage the community by granting representation to underrepresented groups. The third is to transform democracy by granting more decision power and citizenry democratic participation. The fourth is to make government more transparent by creating a dialogue between citizens and the local government. This process allows residents to engage in the political process and regain the trusted of the elected officials.

== History ==
Vallejo is one of the cities in the East Bay of Northern California, having a population of about 115,000 people. It is one of the most ethnically diverse cities in the United States and has beautiful landscapes that include spring mountains, and waterfronts. The city faced some economic challenges in 2008 due to economic recession which resulted in the city filing bankruptcy. The inability to control crimes due to the layoffs of law enforcement personnel and also various government department experienced a great deal of personnel cuts as well. After three years of financial difficulties, the city emerged from bankruptcy and credit to the leadership of the city Mayor and the city council members. The proposed measure B, a sale tax of 1% that would increase the level of public services. The proposed measure B, if passed, will allocate 30% of the revenue generated through the 1% taxes to allow residents decide how and what to utilize the 30% portion of the revenue for in the city.

== Supporters and funding ==
Measure B was adopted by the city council in 2011 and the major player and driving force behind the project was Councilwoman Marti Brown. The city hired a non-government organization to provide a framework, strategies and options to create a program for the city of Vallejo. The city agrees to use part of the funds from measure B which was about $200,000 for the operational cost of the program. The citizen would be able to decide which projects within the city are appropriate to use the 30% of the revenue for, which was around $3 million in 2015.

== Participant selection ==
The participant selection process began in mid-2012. There were four mechanisms for participant selection. First, thirteen members of local civic organizations were selected by the City to serve on the Steering Committee, the main overseer of the project. The City Council took this measure because it wanted fair representation for minority groups in the community. They chose members from the following groups: Better Vallejo, Vallejo Chapter of the National Association for the Advancement of Colored People (NAACP), Greater Vallejo Recreation District, Solano Hispanic Chamber of Commerce, Vallejo Convention and Visitors Bureau, Solano County Black Chamber of Commerce, Belvedere Homeowners Association, Vallejo Chamber of Commerce, Heritage District Neighborhood Watch, Solano Community College District, Hillcrest Park Homeowners Association, Filipino-American Retired US Armed Forces Association, Parkview Terrace Neighborhood Association, Vallejo Heights Neighborhood Association, Hiddenbrooke Property Owners Association, Vallejo Sister City Association, Filipino Community of Solano County, Filipino-American Chamber of Commerce, Solano Association of Realtors. Florence Douglas Senior Center

== Deliberation, decisions and public interactions ==
The deliberation process began in fall 2012. The cycle was divided into four phases. This organization was mandated by the Steering Committee’s Rule Book, a document that laid out the plans and regulations for the PB process. Budget assemblies were held during the first phase, which ran in October and November 2012. These were community meetings where the City Council and the Participatory Budgeting Project presented information to residents on the participatory budgeting process. Turnout to these meetings was moderate however a large number of youth appeared. In an interview with a local newspaper, a seventeen-year old girl commented that she was fascinated by the City’s presentation after having been dragged to the meeting by her father (Semuels, 2014, June 3 2015). During this initial period, locals were able to converse with the Steering Committee and to brainstorm project initiatives. During these months, residents could apply as budget delegates. This position enabled them to attend meetings and to work intimately with the Steering Committee to suggest project proposals. They were also responsible for creating campaigns that educated ordinary citizens on the process.
