= International Journal of Urban and Regional Research =

- Discipline: Urban studies, geography
- Language: English
- Edited by: Mustafa Dikeç, Hyun Bang Shin, Liza Weinstein

Publication details
- History: 1977-present
- Publisher: Wiley-Blackwell on behalf of the IJURR Foundation (United Kingdom)
- Frequency: Bimonthly
- Impact factor: 4.364 (2020)

Standard abbreviations
- ISO 4: Int. J. Urban Reg. Res.

Indexing
- ISSN: 0309-1317 (print); 1468-2427 (web)
- LCCN: 79649742
- OCLC no.: 57197162

Links
- Journal homepage; Online access; Online archive

The International Journal of Urban and Regional Research (IJURR) is a bimonthly peer-reviewed academic journal published by Wiley-Blackwell on behalf of the IJURR Foundation. It was established in 1977 by a group of editors, who partnered with Edward Arnold for publishing. Blackwell (now Wiley-Blackwell) took over publishing from Edward Arnold in 1991. The owners transferred IJURR to a charity (now known as the IJURR Foundation) in 1995. IJURR published quarterly until 2010. The journal covers urban and regional research topics from a social sciences perspective. The journal has an "Interventions" section, and also publishes book reviews, theoretical articles, and symposia (collections of articles on a more narrowly defined topic).

According to the Journal Citation Reports, the journal has a 2015 impact factor of 1.868, ranking it 9th out of 38 journals in the category "Urban Studies", 9th out of 55 journals in the category "Planning & Development", and 21st out of 72 journals in the category "Geography".
