= List of participatory budgeting votes =

List of cities with participatory budgets

List of participatory budgeting votes (Europe)
European cities appearing in the list
List of participatory budgeting votes (Earth)
Non-European cities appearing in the list

This is a list of votes held by major cities as part of a participatory budgeting process, where people living in the city are allowed to vote for a number of proposals, and the funded proposals are determined based on the votes. While not all participatory budgeting processes include a formal voting stage, it is a very common feature, particularly in Europe. The list includes votes held in major cities with a population of at least 100,000 and a total amount equivalent to at least €100,000 being voted on. To be included, the vote must be open to the whole public (rather than limited to a jury) and its results must be de facto binding on the government. The list also includes votes held by states, provinces, or countries, if they meet these criteria (this includes Portugal and some Australian states).

Many cities divide their available budget among city districts and allow each voter to vote only on proposals located in their district. In effect, these are several independent votes happening simultaneously, but in the list, these sub-elections are merged into one. Some cities additionally hold a vote about city-wide proposals, and some allow voters to vote in several or all districts.

Participatory budgeting processes typically go through several stages (usually including soliciting proposals, selecting proposals, voting on proposals, and implementation), and this can take several years. There are different conventions of which year to use in referring to a particular process (e.g. some cities use the year in which the vote occurs, and others the year in which project implementation starts). In the table, the year refers to the year of the last day on which voters can cast their votes.

The list includes a brief description of the voting systems employed in the vote. This includes a choice of ballot format specifying how voters can indicate their preferences. The table uses the following terms to describe common choices:

- knapsack votes (where voters can vote for any number of proposals, but the cost of the selected proposals must sum up to less than the available budget),
- k-approval (where voters can vote for up to k proposals; common choices for k are 1, 5, and 10),
- spreading points (where each voter has a number of votes (such as 10) that can be spread across proposals, but the same proposal can receive several votes; also known as cumulative voting), and
- ranking (where voters select up to k proposals and then rank them).

Cities then use a system to decide on the winning proposals. Typically this is done by sorting proposals by the number of votes the proposal received, and then repeatedly selecting the proposals with the highest number until the available budget runs out. Some cities also impose additional constraints on the process (such as a maximum amount that can be spent in any single neighborhood, or a minimum amount that must be spent in a certain category of projects) or use a more complicated participatory budgeting rule (see Combinatorial participatory budgeting for detailed descriptions of common aggregation rules).

City	Year	Population	Voters	Budget	Proposals (elected)	Voting system	Notes
Australia New South Wales	2019	8,095,430	61,437	A$24,700,000	1500 (248)	Rank 3–5 projects.	Ranks get converted into points (10, 5, 3, 2, 1 points). Each electorate was allocated the same amount of funding, and voting and decisions were done separately in each electorate.
Australia Victoria	2018	6,497,700	95,000	A$30,000,000	2300 (237)	3-approval among projects near (5 km/50 km) living place.	At most 50% of a region's budget can be spent in one locality.
Belgium Brussels	2018	1,208,542	2,045	€134,070	18 (10)	Knapsack vote, city-wide.	
Canada Montreal	2021	1,762,949	20,017	CA$25,000,000	35 (12)	5-approval.	Budget was increased from 10 million to 25 million after the vote.
Finland Helsinki	2021	658,864	47,064	€8,800,000	396 (75)	Knapsack vote, city-wide and 1 district.	
Finland Helsinki	2019	658,864	40,264	€4,400,000	296 (44)		
France Brest	2022	139,926		€1,300,000	42 (19)	Rank 3 projects (3 points to the first-ranked / 2 points to the second-ranked / 1 point to the third-ranked).	Select the highest ranking project in each district, then follow complicated rules for the remaining budget.
France Grenoble	2022	158,198	4,825	€800,000	27 (7)	Vote for 6 projects.	
France Grenoble	2020	158,198	4,711	€800,000	29 (12)	Vote for 6 projects.	
France Grenoble	2019	158,198	6,463	€800,000	21 (9)	Vote for 5 projects.	
France Grenoble	2018	158,198	5,625	€800,000	23 (6)	Vote for 1 large project (> €200k) and 4 small projects (< €200k).	1 large project wins, and as many small projects as the budget allows.
France Grenoble	2017	158,198	3,500	€800,000	25 (9)	Vote for 1 large project (> €200k) and 6 small projects (< €200k).	1 large project wins, and as many small projects as the budget allows.
France Grenoble	2016	158,198	7,073	€800,000	26 (13)	Vote for 2 large projects (> €100k) and 5 small projects (< €100k).	
France Grenoble	2015	158,198	998	€800,000	19 (9)	Rank 2 of the large projects (> €100k) and 4 of the small projects (< €100k).	
France Lille (Note: In years prior to 2022, Lille used a jury to make decisions, not a vote.)	2022	234,475	7,029	€2,000,000	70 (20)	5-approval.	€500,000 reserved for projects proposed by minors.
France Lyon	2022	522,969	6,000	€12,500,000	217 (110)	10-approval.	Voters have to vote for at least 3 projects. They can vote for projects in all districts, each of which has a separate maximum budget that can be spent on projects from that district.
France Paris	2023	2,165,423		€75,960,000		Grade projects on a 4-point scale.	Majority judgment.
France Paris	2022	2,165,423	142,122	€82,000,000	204 (62)	Grade projects on a 4-point scale.	Select a fixed number (2 or 3) of projects in each district with the highest median score (majority judgment).
France Paris	2021	2,165,423	106,326	€75,000,000	217 (62)	Grade projects on a 4-point scale.	Select a fixed number (2 or 3) of projects in each district with the highest median score (majority judgment).
France Paris	2019	2,165,423	143,822	€100,000,000	430 (192)	4-approval for city-wide and 4-approval for district projects.	
France Paris	2018	2,165,423	127,880	€88,000,000	457 (180)	4-approval for city-wide and 4-approval for district projects.	
France Paris	2017	2,165,423	98,269	€92,000,000	484 (196)	5-approval for city-wide and 5-approval for district projects.	
France Paris	2016	2,165,423	92 808	€94,100,000	624 (219)	5-approval for city-wide and 5-approval for district projects.	A minimum of 30 million euros must be allocated to projects in working-class neighborhoods.
France Paris	2015	2,165,423	66,870	€67,700,000	624 (188)	5-approval for city-wide and 5-approval for district projects.	
France Paris	2014	2,165,423	40,745	€17,700,000	15 (9)	5-approval for city-wide projects.	
France Saint-Denis	2021	113,116	5,585	€1,000,000	86 (24)	Rank 3 projects in district and city-wide.	Gives 3/2/1 points to the ranked projects.
France Strasbourg	2021	287,228		€2,000,000	68 (19)	Spread 5 points among projects.	
France Strasbourg	2019	287,228	2,208	€1,000,000	68 (31)	Spread 5 points among projects.	Winner selection somewhat ad hoc.
France Toulouse	2022	493,465	4,532	€8,000,000	200 (83)	3-approval city-wide.	Each district has a budget of €300,000. The remaining €2,000,000 can be used for projects from any district.
France Toulouse	2019	493,465	1,494	€1,000,000	30 (14)	Spread 7 points across projects, with each project getting at most 3 points.	Budget was raised from €850,000 after the vote ended to fund more projects.
Germany Wuppertal	2021	355,004	6,000	€200,000	31 (6)	5-approval city-wide.	The budget was partially contributed by private partners. €20,000 of the budget was set aside for micro-projects with cost under €2,000. Shortlisting projects was partially achieved via a separate vote.
Hungary Budapest	2024	1,752,286	29,000	1,000,000,000 Ft	175 (13)	Five categories, 3 approvals per category	
Hungary Budapest	2023	1,752,286	25,857	1,000,000,000 Ft	(12)	Five categories	
Hungary Budapest	2022	1,752,286	21,858	1,000,000,000 Ft	49 (18)	Projects come in three categories, vote for exactly 1 large project and 1 small project in each category.	
Hungary Budapest	2021	1,752,286	13,344	1,000,000,000 Ft	53 (15)	Projects come in three categories, vote for exactly 1 project in each category.	
Hungary Budapest XI. District (New Buda)	2024	141,090		90,000,000 Ft		Grade projects on a 6-point scale, across 6 districts.	
Hungary Budapest XIII. District	2025	120,256	12,616	90,000,000 Ft	130 (41)	Unlimited approvals per district (unlimited voting allowed in all districts for all voters), 15 districts	Districts match local council districts.
Hungary Budapest XIII. District	2024	120,256	12,514	90,000,000 Ft	122 (45)	Unlimited approvals per district (unlimited voting allowed in all districts for all voters), 15 districts	Districts match local council districts.
Hungary Budapest XIII. District	2023	120,256	12,365	60,000,000 Ft	105 (40)	Unlimited approvals per district (unlimited voting allowed in all districts for all voters), 15 districts	Districts match local council districts.
Hungary Budapest XIII. District	2022	120,256		60,000,000 Ft		Unlimited approvals per district (unlimited voting allowed in all districts for all voters), 15 districts	Districts match local council districts.
Hungary Budapest XIII. District	2021	120,256	2541	60,000,000 Ft	109 (40)	Unlimited approvals per district (unlimited voting allowed in all districts for all voters), 15 districts	Districts match local council districts.
Hungary Budapest III. District (Óbuda-Békásmegyer)	2025	124,746		150,000,000 Ft	30 (10)	1 approval per district (voting allowed in all districts for all voters), 10 districts	
Hungary Budapest III. District (Óbuda-Békásmegyer)	2024	124,746	20,150	100,000,000 Ft	30 (10)	1 approval per district (voting allowed in all districts for all voters), 10 districts	
Hungary Budapest III. District (Óbuda-Békásmegyer)	2023	124,746		100,000,000 Ft	30 (10)	1 approval per district (voting allowed in all districts for all voters), 10 districts	
Hungary Budapest III. District (Óbuda-Békásmegyer)	2022	124,746	7290	100,000,000 Ft	30 (10)	1 approval per district (voting allowed in all districts for all voters), 10 districts	
Hungary Budapest III. District (Óbuda-Békásmegyer)	2021	124,746	6500	75,000,000 Ft	30 (10)	1 approval per district (voting allowed in all districts for all voters), 10 districts	
Hungary Budapest III. District (Óbuda-Békásmegyer)	2020	124,746		50,000,000 Ft	30 (10)	1 approval per district (voting allowed in all districts for all voters), 10 districts	
Hungary Miskolc	2024	147,533	244	40,000,000 Ft	45 (3)	Knapsack vote (three nominal categories, independent of approvals)	
Hungary Miskolc	2023	147,533	107	40,000,000 Ft	48 (12)	Knapsack vote (three nominal categories, independent of approvals)	
Hungary Miskolc	2022	147,533	134	40,000,000 Ft	38 (10)	Knapsack vote (three nominal categories, independent of approvals)	
Hungary Pécs	2024	139,330	10,334	100,000,000 Ft	50 (10)	2 approvals (1 in "home" zone, 1 in another "zone" - 10 zones in total)	
Hungary Pécs	2023	139,330	6168	100,000,000 Ft	50 (10)	Single choice in "home" zone (10 zones in total)	
Iceland Reykjavík	2021	133,262	18,389	850,000,000 kr	277 (111)	Knapsack vote with option to "star" one project, giving it 2 votes	
Iceland Reykjavík	2019	128,793	13,608	450,000,000 kr	239 (91)	Knapsack vote with option to "star" one project, giving it 2 votes	
Iceland Reykjavík	2018	126,041	13,003	450,000,000 kr	238 (88)	Knapsack vote with option to "star" one project, giving it 2 votes	
Iceland Reykjavík	2017	123,246	11,113	450,000,000 kr	230 (76)	Knapsack vote with option to "star" one project, giving it 2 votes	
Iceland Reykjavík	2016	122,460	9,292	455,700,000 kr	190 (112)	Knapsack vote	
Italy Bologna	2020	394,843	22,247	€2,000,000	79 (24)	Choose 1 redevelopment (investment) project, and 1 neighborhood priority.	For redevelopment projects, the most voted proposal of each district is implemented. For neighborhood priorities, the top 3 of each district are implemented and are funded with 75,000, 55,000 and 28,000 euros, respectively.
Italy Bologna	2018	394,843	16,348	€1,000,000	33 (6)	Choose 1 project.	For each district, the most voted project of each district is implemented.
Italy Bologna	2017	394,843	14,584	€1,000,000	27 (6)	Choose 1 project.	For each district, the most voted project of each district is implemented.
Italy Milan	2018	1,396,059	17,627	€4,500,000	47 (12)	3-approval.	3 projects funded with reduced budget.
Italy Rome	2019	2,860,009	16,993	€20,000,000	111 (65)	3-approval, city-wide.	Focussed on urban decor. Budget allocation to districts was partially based on district area. Bonus budget went to the district with highest turnout.
Latvia Riga	2022	660,187	42,692	€693,000	30 (11)	Knapsack vote.	
Latvia Riga	2021	660,187	19,011	€606,032	22 (10)	Knapsack vote.	
Latvia Riga	2020	660,187	23,915	€500,000	15 (6)	Knapsack vote.	
Latvia Riga	2019	660,187	10,065	€494,797	14 (6)	Knapsack vote.	
Poland Gdańsk	2022	486,271	41,217	22,063,118zł	305 (117)	Choose 1 city-wide project, 1 city-wide green project, 1 district green project, and spread 5 points across projects in any district.	
Poland Gdańsk	2021	486,271	43,190	20,830,669zł	387 (121)	Choose 1 city-wide project, 1 city-wide green project, 1 district green project, and spread 5 points across projects in any district.	Projects need at least 200 points to win (400 points for city-wide projects).
Poland Gdańsk	2020	486,542	40,383	18,428,001zł	357 (115)	Choose 1 city-wide project, 1 city-wide green project, 1 district green project, and spread 5 points across projects in any district.	
Poland Gdańsk	2019	470,907	53,025	18,543,609zł	331 (75)	Choose 1 city-wide project, and spread 5 points across projects in any district.	
Poland Gdańsk	2018	466,631	48,760	19,549,000zł	319 (82)	Choose 1 city-wide project, and spread 5 points across projects in any district.	Projects must receive at least 100 votes to win. Unused funds are saved for the following year.
Poland Gdańsk	2017	464,254	44,655	14,000,000zł	297 (103)	Choose 1 city-wide project, and spread 5 points across projects in any district.	
Poland Gdańsk	2016	463,754	36,971	12,500,000zł	254 (91)	Choose 1 city-wide project, and spread 5 points across projects in any district.	
Poland Gdynia	2021	243,918	25,532	11,148,564zł	297 (123)	3-approval for city, district (small projects), district (large projects)	One project was partially funded by a donor who contributed 356zł
Poland Gdynia	2020	243,918	28,943	10,608,600zł	281 (130)	3-approval for city, district (small projects), district (large projects)	
Poland Gdynia	2019	243,918	31,263	10,178,864zł	275 (117)	Rank 5 projects in city and in district.	City and district councils decided to fund some projects that did not fit in the available budget.
Poland Gdynia	2018	243,918	30,301	5,898,400zł	97 (31)	Rank 5 projects in district.	As incentive, the district with the highest turnout gets an extra "+1" project funded.
Poland Gdynia	2017	243,918	36,525	5,310,198zł	132 (32)	Rank 5 projects in district.	As incentive, the district with the highest turnout gets an extra "+1" project funded.
Poland Gdynia	2016	243,918	44,167	5,203,543zł	141 (31)	Rank 5 projects in district (5 points for the top rank, 4 points for the second rank, etc).	As incentive, the district with the highest turnout gets an extra "+1" project funded.
Poland Gdynia	2015	243,918	47,612	4,597,796zł	177 (40)	Knapsack vote.	
Poland Gdynia	2014	243,918	40,863	3,000,000zł	234 (41)	Knapsack vote.	Unspent funds (in 2014, 597,796zł) carry over to the next year. 11 of the 41 winning projects concerned the development of outdoor gyms.
Poland Kraków	2021	782,137	51,229	35,000,000zł	596 (180)	Rank 3 projects in city and in district.	
Poland Kraków	2020	782,137	44,800	32,000,000zł	574 (195)	Rank 3 projects in city and in district.	
Poland Kraków	2019	782,137	50,004	30,000,000zł	557 (171)	Rank 3 projects in city and in district.	Voters were entered into a lottery to win 100 tablet computers.
Poland Poznań	2021	529,410	85,115	22,000,000zł	150 (35)	Choose 1 city-wide project, 1 green project, 2 district projects.	Separate district elections plus city-wide and green election.
Poland Poznań	2020	532,048	87,575	21,000,000zł	175 (34)	Choose 1 city-wide project, 1 green project, 2 district projects.	Separate district elections plus city-wide and green election.
Poland Poznań	2019	534,813	68,089	21,000,000zł	239 (35)	Choose 1 city-wide project, and 2 district projects.	Separate district elections plus city-wide election.
Poland Poznań	2018	536,438	55,631	20,000,000zł	259 (30)	Choose 1 city-wide project, and 2 district projects.	Separate district elections plus city-wide election.
Poland Warsaw	2022	1,792,718	93,539	93,575,094zł	1429 (349)	15-approval in district, 10-approval city-wide.	
Poland Warsaw	2021	1,792,718	109,025	83,000,000zł	1503 (359)	15-approval in district, 10-approval city-wide.	
Poland Warsaw	2020	1,794,166	105,822	83,000,000zł	1425 (414)	15-approval in district, 10-approval city-wide.	
Poland Warsaw	2019	1,790,658	89,807	64,000,000zł	1628 (850)	Knapsack vote. Vote for projects in a single neighborhood.	In some districts, can vote (knapsack) for the district and vote (knapsack) for a neighborhood.
Poland Warsaw	2018	1,777,972	117,381	61,419,912zł	1808 (881)		
Poland Warsaw	2017	1,764,615	128,406	58,588,894zł	1749 (770)	Knapsack vote. Vote for projects in a single neighborhood.	In some districts, can vote (knapsack) for the district and vote (knapsack) for a neighborhood.
Poland Warsaw	2016	1,753,977	172,395	51,000,000zł	1464 (644)	Knapsack vote. Vote for projects in a single neighborhood.	In some districts, can vote (knapsack) for the district and vote (knapsack) for a neighborhood.
Poland Warsaw	2015	1,744,351	166,893	26,000,000zł	1390 (336)	5-approval. Vote for projects in a single neighborhood.	In some districts, can vote (5-approval) for the district and vote (5-approval) for a neighborhood.
Poland Wrocław	2022	642,687	86,750	30,000,000zł	170 (17)	Choose 1 local project and 1 global project.	Separate budget limit for local and global projects, but no separate elections per district.
Poland Wrocław	2021	642,687	89,933	25,000,000zł	173 (20)	Choose 1 local project and 1 global project.	Separate budget limit for local and global projects, but no separate elections per district.
Poland Wrocław	2020	641,928	95,206	25,000,000zł	199 (20)	Choose 1 local project and 1 global project.	Separate budget limit for local and global projects, but no separate elections per district.
Poland Wrocław	2019	642,869	86,484	25,000,000zł	235 (20)	Choose 1 local project and 1 global project.	Separate budget limit for local and global projects, but no separate elections per district.
Poland Wrocław	2018	640,648	68,670	25,250,000zł	263 (63)	Choose 1 small local project, 1 large local project, 2 city-wide projects, 1 monument project.	Each district is allocated the same budget.
Poland Wrocław	2017	638,586	97,043	25,000,000zł	372 (64)	Choose 1 small local project, 1 large local project, 2 city-wide projects.	Each district is allocated the same budget.
Poland Łódź	2021	664,071	87,397	26,000,000zł	716 (257)	5-approval for local projects and 5-approval for global projects.	Separate district elections plus city-wide election. Voter can vote for local projects in two districts.
Poland Łódź	2020	672,185	68,329	24,000,000zł	601 (242)	5-approval for local projects and 5-approval for global projects.	Separate district elections plus city-wide election. Voter can vote for local projects in two districts.
Poland Łódź	2019	679,941	162,658	50,000,000zł	1043 (261)	5-approval.	Separate district elections. Voter can vote for local projects in all districts.
Poland Łódź	2018	685,285	113,764	40,000,000zł	837 (235)	5-approval for local projects and 5-approval for global projects.	Separate district elections plus city-wide election. Voter can vote for local projects in one district.
Poland Łódź	2017	690,422	97,974	40,000,000zł	730 (233)	5-approval for local projects and 5-approval for global projects.	Separate district elections plus city-wide election. Voter can vote for local projects in one district.
Portugal Portugal	2018	10,276,617	71,125 (Note: This is the number of votes for regional projects. Each voter has two votes (regional/national), but only the total number of votes, not of individual voters, was reported. In 2018, there were 71,125 regional votes and 48,578 national votes. In 2017, there were "about 45 thousand" votes for regional projects, and about 35 thousand for national projects.)	€5,000,000	691 (22)	Choose 1 nation-wide project and 1 regional project.	Could vote online or by SMS.
Portugal Portugal	2017	10,291,027	45,000	€3,000,000	599 (38)	Choose 1 nation-wide project and 1 regional project.	Could vote online or by SMS.
Spain Barcelona	2021	1,620,343	39,433	€30,000,000	184 (76)	Knapsack vote. Each voter can vote in their district of residence and a second freely chosen district.	
Spain Madrid	2022	3,223,334	36,265	€50,000,000	209 (132)	Knapsack vote with negative votes. Negative votes subtract 0.33 points.	
Spain Madrid	2019	3,223,334	32,418	€100,000,000	693 (369)	Knapsack vote.	
Spain Madrid	2018	3,223,334	56,082	€100,000,000	702 (328)	Knapsack vote.	
Spain Madrid	2017	3,223,334	38,866	€100,000,000	720 (311)	Knapsack vote.	
Spain Madrid	2016	3,223,334	32,817	€60,000,000	623 (206)	Knapsack vote.	
Spain Valencia	2021	789,744	20,611	€8,000,000	283 (139)	Knapsack vote.	
Spain Valencia	2019	789,744	14,530	€8,000,000	63 (21)	Knapsack vote.	Single city-wide election.
Spain Valencia	2018	789,744	14,455	€8,000,000	202 (103)	Knapsack vote.	
Spain Valencia	2017	789,744	12,987	€7,000,000	47 (7)	Knapsack vote.	Single city-wide election.
Spain Valencia	2017	789,744	12,407	€7,000,000	115 (71)	Knapsack vote.	
Switzerland Lausanne	2022	139,111	18,355	CHF 175,000	21 (12)	Approval vote.	Need to vote for at least 3 projects, no maximum.
Switzerland Lausanne	2021	139,111	3,078	CHF 175,000	15 (11)	Knapsack vote.	CHF 12,928 were left unspent.
Switzerland Zürich	2021	434,335	1,804	CHF 540,000	135 (61)	Knapsack vote in one of 4 districts.	
USA Cambridge	2021	118,403	7,441	US$1,000,000	20 (7)	5-approval.	Budget overshot to fund 7th project.
USA Cambridge	2020	118,403	7,250	US$500,000	16 (7)	5-approval.	Budget overshot to US$525,000.
USA Cambridge	2019	118,403	7,602	US$1,000,000	20 (8)	5-approval.	Budget overshot to US$1,125,000.
USA Cambridge	2018	118,403	6,849	US$900,000	20 (6)	5-approval.	Budget overshot to US$925,000.
USA Cambridge	2017	118,403	6,778	US$800,000	20 (7)	5-approval.	Budget overshot to US$867,000.
USA Cambridge	2016	118,403	4,730	US$700,000	20 (7)	5-approval.	Budget overshot to US$706,000.
USA Cambridge	2015	118,403	4,184	US$600,000	23 (7)	6-approval.	One project's budget was reduced to fit in the budget.
USA Cambridge	2015	118,403	2,727	US$500,000	20 (6)	5-approval.	Pilot. Budget overshot to US$528,000.
USA Greensboro	2019	299,035	3,961	US$500,000	26 (20)		Some projects received partial funding to fit within the budget. 5 separate district elections.
USA New York City (Note: Only parts of the city. Residents of a changing collection of city council districts can vote.)	2019	5,080,147 (Note: This is the sum of the populations of the participating city council districts according to the 2010 census.)	118,308	US$39,000,000	346 (145)	5-approval.	Residents of 32 city council districts were able to vote on projects in their district.
USA New York City	2018	4,288,042	99,252	US$28,500,000	303 (122)	5-approval.	Residents of 27 city council districts were able to vote on projects in their district.
USA New York City	2017	4,772,217	102,800	US$40,000,000	394 (138)	5-approval.	Residents of 31 city council districts were able to vote on projects in their district.
USA New York City	2016	4,408,140	67,690	US$38,295,700	379 (132)	5-approval.	Residents of 28 city council districts were able to vote on projects in their district.
USA New York City	2015	3,806,281	51,362	US$32,459,025	348 (114)	5-approval.	Residents of 24 city council districts were able to vote on projects in their district.
USA Vallejo	2021	126,090	1,909	US$500,000	11 (8)		
USA Vallejo	2019	126,090		US$1,000,000	12 (9)	2-approval.	
USA Vallejo	2018	126,090	5,205	US$1,000,000	10 (10)	2-approval.	1 project received partial funding.
USA Vallejo	2017	126,090	4,216	US$1,000,000	19 (4)	4-approval.	
USA Vallejo	2015	126,090	3,098	US$1,000,000	25 (5)	Vote for 1 of 2 "people projects" and for 4 of 17 "infrastructure projects".	
USA Vallejo	2014	126,090	3,098	US$2,440,000	42 (8)	5-approval.	
USA Vallejo	2013	126,090	3,917	US$3,200,000	33 (12)	6-approval.	

== See also ==
- Participatory budgeting by country
- Nashville and Jersey City have also done PB. According to Yang et al., they used an unusual input method: quadratic voting.
