= Participatory budgeting =

Democratic financial decision-making process

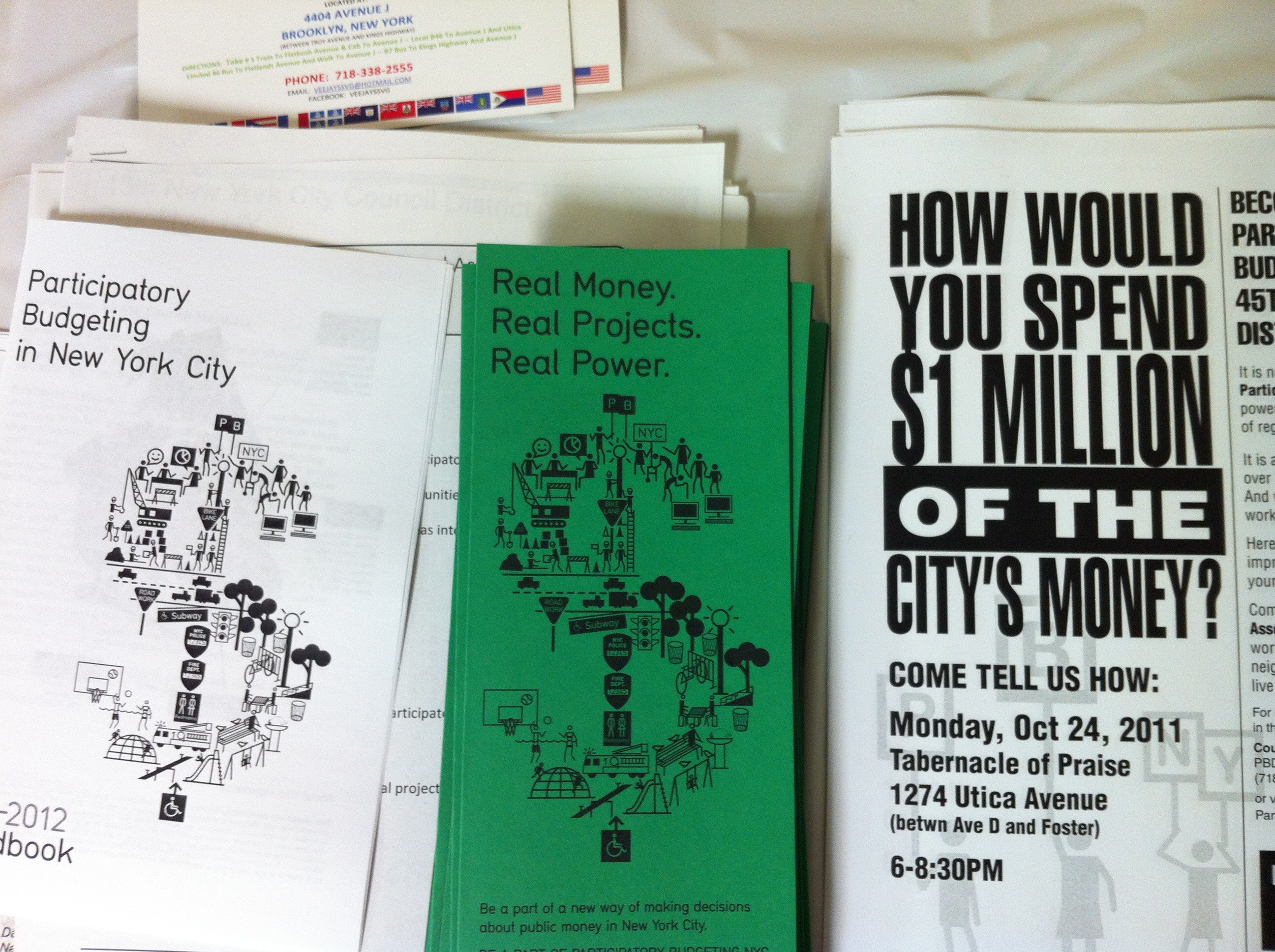
Participatory budgeting pamphlets

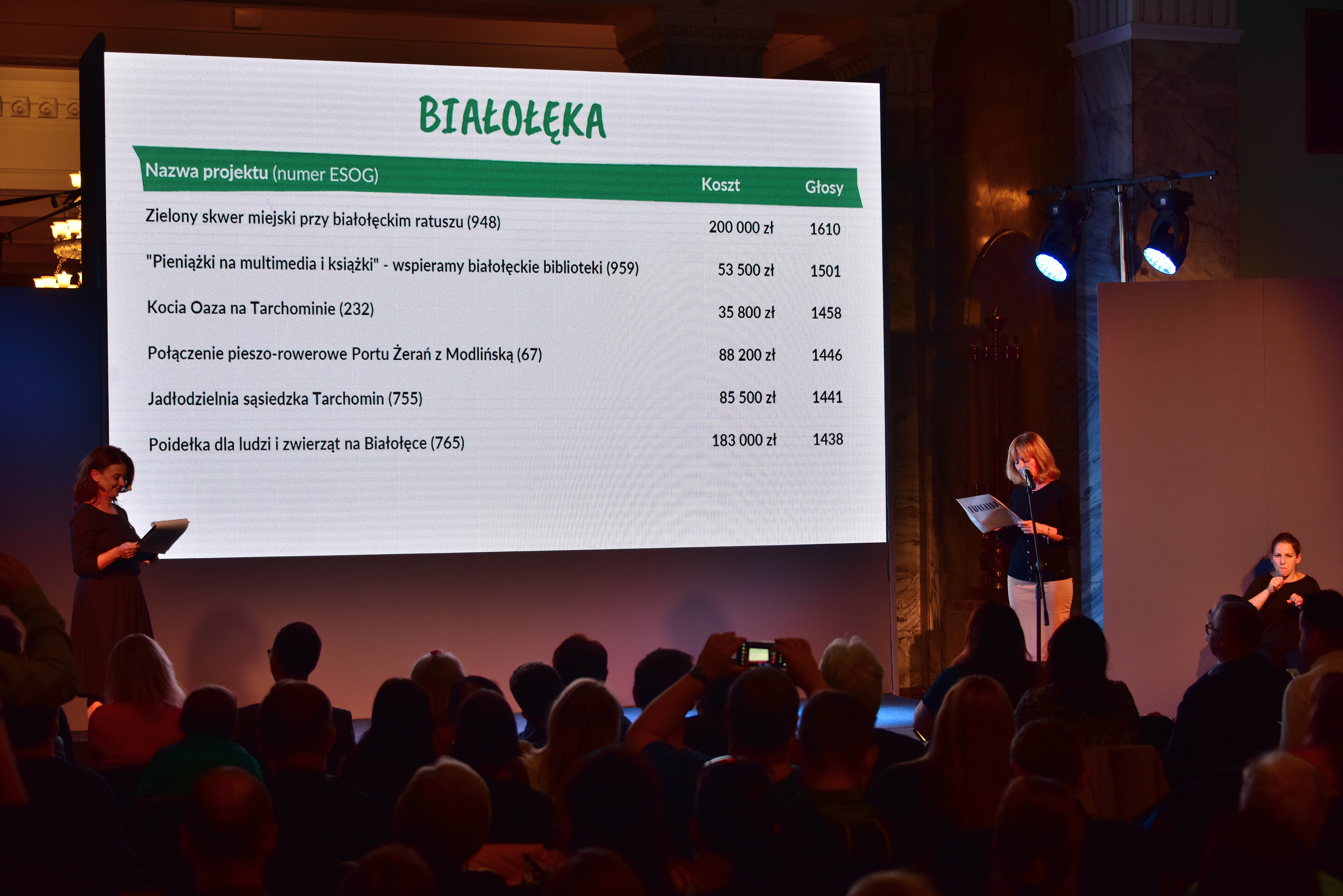
Presentation of the winning participatory budgeting projects in the district of Białołęka, Warsaw

Participatory budgeting (PB) is a type of citizen sourcing in which ordinary people decide how to allocate part of a municipal or public budget through a process of democratic deliberation and decision-making. These processes typically begin with a series of neighborhood popular assemblies to initiate and discuss proposals and end with voting on the final decisions.

Participatory budgeting allows citizens or residents of a locality to identify, discuss, and prioritize public spending projects, and gives them the power to make real decisions about how money is spent. Participatory budgeting processes are typically designed to involve those left out of traditional methods of public engagement, such as low-income residents, non-citizens, and youth. A comprehensive case study of eight municipalities in Brazil analyzing the successes and failures of participatory budgeting has suggested that it often results in more equitable public spending, greater government transparency and accountability, increased levels of public participation (especially by marginalized or poorer residents), and democratic and citizenship learning. Participatory budgeting stands as one of several democratic innovations—such as British Columbia's Citizens' Assembly—encompassing the ideals of a participatory democracy.

Frameworks of participatory budgeting differ throughout the globe in terms of scale, procedure, and objective. Participatory budgeting, in its conception, is often contextualized to suit a region's particular conditions and needs. Thus, the magnitudes of participatory budgeting vary depending on whether it is carried out at a municipal, regional, or provincial level. In many cases, participatory budgeting has been legally enforced and regulated; however, some are internally arranged and promoted. Since the original invention in Porto Alegre, Brazil, in 1988, participatory budgeting has manifested itself in a myriad of designs, with variations in methodology, form, and technology. As of 2024, participatory budgeting is becoming a mainstream practice, with over 11,500 municipal PB processes implemented globally, representing significant growth from nearly 1,500 municipalities and institutions in 2014.

== History ==
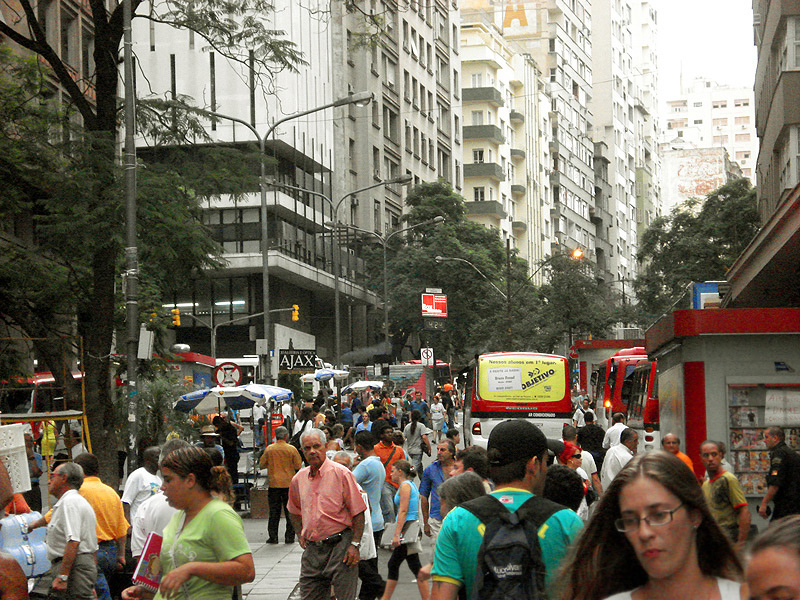
Participatory budgeting has been practiced in Porto Alegre since 1989.

External videos
- "What if you could help decide how the government spends public funds", Shari Davis, TED talk, July 16, 2020.

Participatory budgeting was first developed in the 1980s by the Brazilian Workers' Party (PT), drawing on the party's stated belief that electoral success is not an end in itself but a springboard for developing radical, participatory forms of democracy. While there were several early experiments (including the public budgeting practices of the Brazilian Democratic Movement in municipalities such as Pelotas), the first full participatory budgeting process was implemented in the city of Porto Alegre, Brazil, in 1989. Porto Alegre is the capital city of the state of Rio Grande do Sul, and a busy industrial, financial, and service center; at that time of implementation, it had a population of 1.2 million. The initial success of participatory budgeting in Porto Alegre soon made it attractive to other municipalities. By 2001, more than 100 cities in Brazil had implemented participatory budgeting, while in 2015, thousands of variations have been implemented in the Americas, Africa, Asia, and Europe.

=== Porto Alegre ===
In its first Title, the 1988 Constitution of Brazil states: "All power originates from the people, who exercise it by the means of elected representatives or directly, according to the terms of this Constitution." The authoring of the Constitution was a reaction to the previous twenty years of military dictatorship, and the new Constitution sought to secure individual liberty while also decentralizing and democratizing ruling power, in the hope that authoritarian dictatorship would not reemerge.

Brazil's contemporary political economy is an outgrowth of the Portuguese empire's patrimonial capitalism, where "power was not exercised according to rules, but was structured through personal relationships". Unlike the Athenian ideal of democracy, in which all citizens participate directly and decide policy collectively, Brazil's government is structured as a republic with elected representatives. This creates a separation between the state and civil society, which has opened the doors for clientelism. Because the law-making process occurs behind closed doors, elected officials and bureaucrats can access state resources in ways that benefit certain 'clients', typically those of extraordinary social or economic relevance. The influential clients receive policy favors and repay elected officials with votes from the groups they influence. For example, a neighborhood leader who represents the views of shop owners may ask a local party official for laws to increase foot traffic on commercial streets. At the same time, the neighborhood leader mobilizes shop owners to vote for the political party responsible for the policy. Because this patronage operates on the basis of individual ties between patron and clients, true decision-making power is limited to a small network of party officials and influential citizens rather than the broader public.

In 1989, Olívio Dutra won the mayor's seat in Porto Alegre. In an attempt to encourage popular participation in government and redirect government resources towards the poor, Dutra institutionalized the PT's organizational structure on a citywide level. The result is what we now know as participatory budgeting.

PB was active in Porto Alegre until 2017. Over time, city leaders’ political support for the participatory budget has declined, and Porto Alegre's current leadership has suspended the process.

== Pre-requisites ==
According to the World Bank Group, certain factors are needed for participatory budgeting to be adopted: "[…] strong mayoral support, a civil society willing and able to contribute to ongoing policy debates, a generally supportive political environment that insulates participatory budgeting from legislators' attacks, and financial resources to fund the projects selected by citizens."

There are generally two approaches through which participatory budgeting formulates: top-down and bottom-up. In the top-down approach, the adoption of participatory budgeting is required by the federal government (for example, as in Peru). In the bottom-up approach, local governments initiate participatory budgeting independent from the national agenda (such as in Porto Alegre); with this approach, NGO's and local organizations play crucial roles in mobilizing and informing the community members.

== Procedure ==
Broadly, all participatory budgeting programs allow citizens to deliberate with the goal of creating either a concrete financial plan (a budget), or a recommendation to elected representatives. In the Porto Alegre model, the structure of the scheme gives sub-jurisdictions (neighborhoods) authority over the larger political jurisdiction (the city) of which they are part. Neighborhood budget committees, for example, have authority to determine the citywide budget, not just the allocation of resources for their particular neighborhood. Therefore, mediating institutions are also needed to combine budget preferences expressed by sub-jurisdictions.

Participatory budgeting processes do not adhere to strict rules, but they generally share several basic steps:

1. The municipality decides how much of its budget to allocate to PB projects. For example, in 2018, Czech municipalities have devoted 3.7M Euro to PB, which was about 0.6% of their total expenditures. In 2023, Paris decided to devote about 75 million Euro to PB in 2023 (see List of participatory budgeting votes for details about other countries).
2. The municipality may be divided geographically into multiple districts, so that the residents in each district can focus on projects more relevant to them. The budget available for each district is also determined at this stage.
3. Representatives of the districts, either elected or volunteered, work with government officials in a PB committee. The committees meet regularly to deliberate under a specific timeline, and come up with preliminary project proposals.
4. Proposals, initiated by the citizens, are dealt under different branches of public budget such as recreation, infrastructure, transportation, etc. Participants publicly deliberate with the committee to finalize the projects to be voted on. The initial proposals are developed into feasible proposals by focus groups and experts. In several rounds of deliberation, the list of proposals is shortlisted and finalized.
5. The short-list of proposals is put to a public vote. See Participatory budgeting ballot types for various types of ballots that can be used in the voting process.
6. A pre-determined aggregation rule is used to select the winning projects, and the municipal government implements the winning projects (see combinatorial participatory budgeting for a detailed discussion of various aggregation rules).

This cycle of steps is repeated annually. While the structure of PB cycles is well established, recent analyses have highlighted that most initiatives focus primarily on the formulation and debate phases of the budget cycle, neglecting execution and control stages where key decisions are often made by bureaucratic actors with little citizen oversight.

=== Digital participatory budgeting (e-participatory budgeting) ===
Technology has often used been to support participatory budgeting, which is commonly referred to as e-participatory budgeting. The use of digital technologies in the process was pioneered by the municipality of Ipatinga in Brazil, which offered the citizens the possibility to vote for projects via the Internet in 2001. The online voting option was later integrated to the participatory budgeting of the Brazilian state of Rio Grande do Sul in 2003, and in the municipality of Belo Horizonte in 2006. Since then, the number of participatory budgeting initiatives that included online voting has multiplied around the world, and includes cities like Paris, New York City, Lisbon, Madrid, and Mexico City.

Although the effects of online voting in participatory budgeting have not been widely researched, a study in 2006 examining the case of participatory budgeting of Belo Horizonte suggests that online voting played a role in increasing the number of participants in the process. A 2015 study of Rio Grande do Sul showed an 8.2% increase in total turnout with the introduction of online voting, with the online channel more likely to attract participants who were younger, male, wealthier, and more educated. Despite these differences in participant demographics, a 2017 study found that the introduction of online voting in Rio Grande do Sul did not lead to a systematic difference in vote choices between online and offline voters.

Telephones—both mobile and fixed landlines—have also been used to stimulate uptake of participatory budgeting processes. The municipality of Ipatinga was the first to employ telephony in 2005, by creating a toll-free number for citizens to indicate their preferences for budget allotments, and by sending automated voice and text messages incentivizing citizens to attend the participatory budgeting meetings. Although some initiatives have used text messages to enable mobile voting—such as in La Plata, Argentina and Cascais, Portugal—most usage has been to encourage voting participation, either in-person or via the Internet.

A participatory budgeting algorithm is sometimes used in order to calculate the budget allocation from the votes. This algorithm takes as input a list of projects, the available budget, and the voters' preferences, and returns an allocation of the budget among the projects satisfying some pre-defined requirements.

== Outcomes ==
=== Improvement in citizens' well-being ===
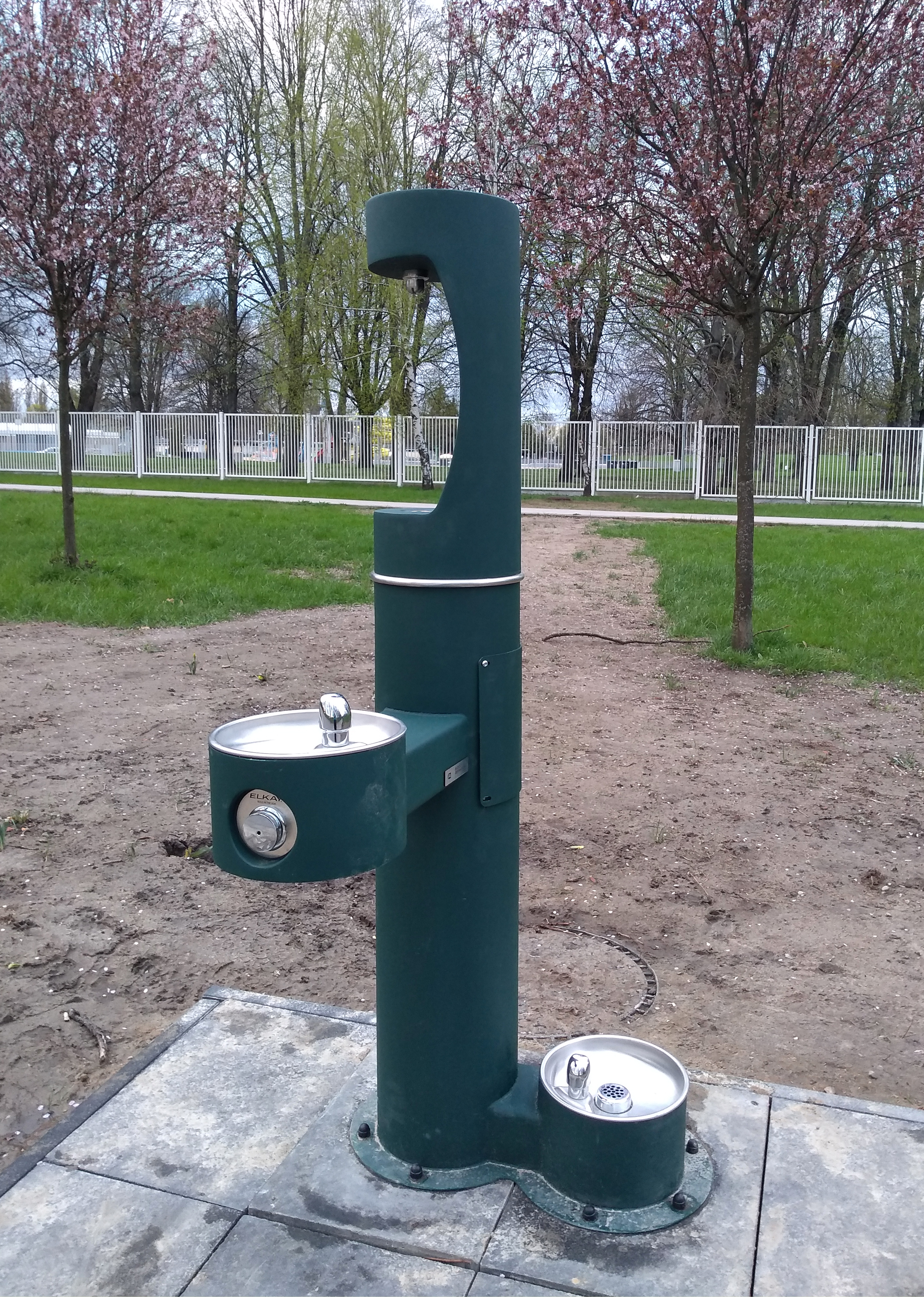
A water dispenser for man and dog funded by participatory budgeting, a park in Warsaw - fot. Ivonna Nowicka

Participatory budgeting has been shown to increase citizen's overall well-being. Some examples include:

- Goncalves showed that increase in PB in Brazil lead to a reduction in infant mortality. The research found that infant mortality rates are substantially lower in governments that use participatory budgeting compared to those that do not. This is due to the fact that infant mortality disproportionately affects poorer income groups more than middle-upper groups, with participatory budgeting leading to an increase in pro-poor investments, such as health and sewage infrastructure.
- A World Bank paper by Bhatnagar, et al. concludes that participatory budgeting can lead to improved conditions for the poor. Although it cannot overcome wider problems such as unemployment, it leads to "noticeable improvement in the accessibility and quality of various public welfare amenities". The paper suggests that participatory budgeting has led to direct improvements in facilities in Porto Alegre. For example, sewer and water connections increased from 75% of households in 1988 to 98% in 1997. Additionally, the number of schools quadrupled since 1986.
- A cross-national study found that greater participation in the preparation and execution of the budget corresponded to greater allocation of public funds in education.
- A study examining the impact of participatory budgeting in New York City finds that it leads to a decrease in overall complaint calls to the 311 number, which indicates an improvement in public service performance.
- A cross-country study found that participatory budgeting positively impacts on the well-being of underserved communities in Brazil, Peru, and South Korea.

These results suggest that countries who "sustain participatory budgeting programs may be part of general improvements in governance that produce[s] more durable access to healthcare." Participatory budgeting has led to advancements in government because democratic governments with this kind of budgeting are able to make better use of public funding.

=== Government transparency ===
Participatory budgeting allows for effective and efficient policy changes, and positively influences aspects such as government transparency. Foremost, participatory budgeting increases budget transparency. In contrast, a lack of transparency can disconnect citizens from their government. For example, in the Dominican Republic, citizens reported that they did not feel they had a voice in their local government and claimed that they were not aware of how to participate in legislation within their districts. Due to this attitude, "citizen's perceptions of such things as why raising tax revenue is important, how public budgets are carried out, or how public works are paid for are often ill-informed."

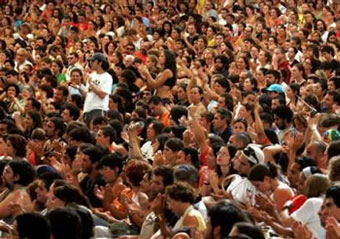
Participatory budgeting in Porto Alegre

=== Advancement in democracy ===
The Colombian organization Fundacion Solidaridad, which seeks to promote democratic developments through participatory budgeting practices, implemented seminars and practices to "facilitate the exchange of experiences in participatory budgeting at the municipal level through dialogues and planning meetings." Fundacion Solidaridad's approaches showed that participatory budgeting led to concrete advancements in democracy. The results concluded that participatory budgeting served as a platform for democratic societies to be able to partner with public institutions and international partners to be able to "promote activities for democracy and transparency at the local level." Increased government transparency allows civic societies to have more impact within their own communities, as well as understand the importance of civic engagement.

After more than a decade, the high number of participants suggests that participatory budgeting encourages increasing citizen involvement, according to the paper. Also, Porto Alegre's health and education budget increased from 13% (1985) to almost 40% (1996), and the share of the participatory budget in the total budget increased from 17% (1992) to 21% (1999).

Research also shows that participatory budgeting has a greater impact over longer periods of time. In a paper that updated the World Bank's methodology, which expanded statistical scope and analyzed Brazil's 253 largest municipalities that use participatory budgeting, researchers found that participatory budgeting reallocates spending towards health and sanitation. The longer that a municipality used participatory budgeting, the more health and sanitation benefits accumulated. Participatory budgeting does not merely allow citizens to shift funding priorities in the short-term—it can yield sustained institutional and political change in the long term.

=== Citizens' attitudes ===
Several studies have found positive effects of PB on the citizens' attitudes towards the government:

- Soonhee Kim studied the effect of PB in South Korea on citizen participation, transparency, and public trust in government. He showed that when citizens participate in PB, they are more inclined to (1) support democracy, (2) perceive democracy as an effective institution, and (3) understand how governmental budgeting works. Through PB, citizens are able to acquire skills that allow them to be active citizens. Participatory budgeting has shown that it "may help marginalized people and other previously excluded groups to build their self-esteem and self-fulfillment through their participation in local budget decisions". Civic participation has also shown to "foster the attitudes and skills of citizenship", and shape identities and loyalties.
- Frenkiel studied three PB projects in China: one in Chengdu and two in Wenling, over seven years. She found that PB contributed to opening the decision-making process to formerly excluded participants, who are local elites and “super residents”.
- Kukuckova checked the effect on PB on the voter turnout in Czech Republic. The evidence regarding this issue is ambiguous. For example, implementing PB in Prague indeed increased the voter turnout at the municipal elections, but in other Czech cities, no significant effect was found.

=== Increase in tax revenues ===
Participatory budgeting has been associated with increased tax revenues. For instance:

- A study examining the case of Porto Alegre suggests that participatory budgeting contributed to an increase of 269% in own-source revenues from 1988 to 2004.
- Another comparative study of 25 municipalities in Latin America and Europe found a significant reduction in tax delinquency after the adoption of participatory budgeting.
- More conclusively, a World Bank study examining 253 cases of participatory budgeting in Brazil found that municipalities with the process collect 39% more local taxes than similar municipalities without it.

=== Recent developments ===
Based on Porto Alegre's system, more than 140 of the 5,571 municipalities in Brazil (about 2.5%) have adopted participatory budgeting.

Recent examples of continued adoption and evolution include:

- Cambridge launched its eleventh PB process in the fall of 2024. From August through October, community members submitted over 1,300 ideas for how to spend $1 million of the city's FY26 budget to improve Cambridge.
- New York City continues to expand its participatory budgeting initiatives, with 24 Council Members across New York City asking residents how to spend $24 million in capital funding, for improvements to schools, parks, libraries, and other public spaces in 2024.
- The European Union has recognized participatory budgeting as "A pathway to inclusive and transparent governance" in 2024, highlighting its growing importance in democratic governance.

Participatory budgeting gives alternative ways for citizens be a part of the democratic process. This has encouraged a worldwide spread. Participatory budgeting is impactful in countries that struggle to provide public services and in rural communities marked by high levels of poverty. Another key adaptation of participatory budgeting is that it is "far less likely to use specific rules that promote social justice and mandates the distribution of greater resources to underserved communities", which allows for greater opportunity to serve poor communities.

== Criticism ==
A systematic review of the literature on participatory budgeting found that, although widely promoted for its democratic potential, participatory budgeting initiatives often face significant structural, design, and personal barriers that hinder their long-term impact on decision-making processes and fiscal responsiveness. These limitations are particularly pronounced in developing countries and at the local government level, where decision-making autonomy and resource availability are more restricted.

=== Lack of representation ===
Reviewing the experience in Brazil and Porto Alegre, a World Bank paper points out that lack of representation of extremely poor people in participatory budgeting can be a shortcoming. Participation of the very poor and of the young is highlighted as a challenge. Nevertheless, studies show that although participants may not fully mirror the demographics of the population as a whole, participatory budgeting fares better than the status quo of traditional representative democracy institutions. For instance, political scientist Graham Smith notes that participatory budgeting in Porto Alegre has been substantially more effective in mobilizing women and citizens from disadvantaged socioeconomic backgrounds. In a similar vein, a report on New York City's process shows that participatory budgeting was more successful in mobilizing people of color and low-income groups than local elections.

=== Clientelism ===
Participatory budgeting may also struggle to overcome existing clientelism.

=== Misallocation of resources ===
Participatory budgeting can harm other government projects, which may not be pursued due to finite resources being allocated elsewhere. In Chicago, participatory budgeting has been criticized for increasing funding to recreational projects while allocating less to infrastructure projects. Additionally, participatory budgeting has many barriers to entry for governments; thus, officials fear electoral costs. Institutions also might lack resources and political will to engage. Some institutions also lack the bureaucratic structure to be able to design and execute this kind of approach.

=== Low participation ===
In some PB elections, the participation rate is very low. For example, there are reports of 0.1% participation rate in Germany, and 1%-3% in Chicago in 2012 and 2014.

== Examples ==
=== Latin America ===
Participatory budgeting in Latin America

In 2012, around 40% of participatory budgeting programs were located in Latin America, where the concept and mechanics of the system were developed in the 1980s. The goal was to "democratize democracy" by engaging the general public, fighting clientelism, and mobilizing the underprivileged who had been left out and left behind by the Brazilian political system. The participatory pyramid consists of three levels: local assemblies that are open to all residents, district participation forums, and a general participatory council at the city level. The meetings' objectives include debating priorities and choosing representatives to oversee the implementation of recommendations. Anyone who desires to participate in open meetings is permitted to do so.

Porto Alegre, Brazil, is an interesting case of Latin American participatory budgeting: following some earlier attempts in smaller towns, participatory budgeting came into its own in Porto Alegre as a result of a "window of opportunity" that emerged following an electoral victory by the Workers' Party in 1988.

=== North America and Europe ===
Adaptations of the participatory democracy model are found mainly in Spain and Italy. Also widespread on the Iberian Peninsula are participatory budgets that incorporate elements of the multi-stakeholder participation model. The most widespread participatory budgets in Europe, however, are those that closely resemble the proximity participation model. Most notably, this model has been embraced in the Netherlands, Denmark, Sweden, Switzerland, Germany, Austria, Portugal, Latvia, and Estonia. Participatory budgeting has also taken root in North America, particularly Canada and the United States.

=== Africa ===
The development of participatory budgeting is relatively recent in Africa. Development took on impetus when the Federation of African Cities and Regional Governments (UCLGAA) took an active role promoting training and visibility regarding participatory budgeting at its triennial International Meeting, Africities, held in Dakar in 2012. The path followed in Africa is the same as the one followed by Latin American radical movements. It differs from European cases, where local governments played a major role. During the 2000s, alternative globalization networks exerted a strong impact.

=== Asia ===
Participatory budgets in Asia began to appear in larger numbers around 2005. Here, participatory budgeting programs were rarely built on pre-existing forms of citizen participation. The fast development of participatory budgets around the world led to the creation of continental networks supporting the dissemination of participatory budgeting. The experience of Porto Alegre, Brazil, has played a particularly important role as a point of reference. For example, local authorities and NGOs from South Korea and China have often visited Porto Alegre, especially since 2009; and in India, the Kerala participatory strategic planning experiment encountered Porto Alegre during the Mumbai World Social Forum.

In 2012, there were 58–109 active experiments in participatory budgeting in Asia.

== See also ==
- Civic engagement
- Citizens' assembly
- Financial referendum
- Participatory economics
- Participatory democracy
- Participatory planning
- Tax choice

== Bibliography ==
- Pereira, Diogo; Roder Figueira, Ariane (2022), "Rationales and Barriers to Citizen Participation in Public Budgeting: A systematic literature review", Revista Brasileira de Ciência Política, 39 (39) e258470: 1–34, doi:10.1590/0103-3352.2022.39.258470
- Sintomer, Yves; Herzberg, Carsten; Röcke, Anja (2008), From Porto Alegre to Europe: Potentials and Limitations of Participatory Budgeting (PDF), International Journal of Urban and Regional Research, archived from the original (PDF) on 20 June 2017.
- Geissel, Brigitte; Newton, Kenneth (2012), Evaluating Democratic Innovations: Curing the Democratic Malaise?, Routledge, ISBN 9781136579950.
- Gilman, Hollie Russon (2012), Transformative Deliberations: Participatory Budgeting in the United States, Journal of Public Deliberation, archived from the original (PDF) on 11 June 2017.
- Gilman, Hollie Russon (2016), Engaging Citizens: Participatory Budgeting and the Inclusive Governance Movement within the United States (PDF), Ash Center for Democratic Governance and Innovation, Harvard Kennedy School.
- Novy, Andreas; Leubolt, Bernhard (2005), "Participatory Budgeting in Porto Alegre: Social Innovation and the Dialectical Relationship of State and Civil Society", Urban Studies, 42 (11): 2023–2036, Bibcode:2005UrbSt..42.2023N, doi:10.1080/00420980500279828, S2CID 143202031.
- Goldfrank, Benjamin (2006), Lessons from Latin American Experience in Participatory Budgeting (PDF), San Juan, Puerto Rico.
- Avritzer, Leonardo (2006), "New Public Spheres in Brazil: Local Democracy and Deliberative Politics", International Journal of Urban and Regional Research, 30 (3): 623–637, doi:10.1111/j.1468-2427.2006.00692.x.
- de Sousa Santos, Boaventura (1998), "Participatory Budgeting in Porto Alegre: Toward a Redistributive Democracy", Politics & Society, 26 (4): 461–510, doi:10.1177/0032329298026004003, hdl:10316/10839, S2CID 220787756.
- Souza, Celina (2001), "Participatory budgeting in Brazilian cities: limits and possibilities in building democratic institutions", Environment and Urbanization, 13 (1): 159–184, Bibcode:2001EnUrb..13..159S, doi:10.1177/095624780101300112.
- Cabannes, Yves (2004), "Participatory budgeting: a significant contribution to participatory democracy", Environment and Urbanization, 16 (1): 27–46, Bibcode:2004EnUrb..16...27C, doi:10.1177/095624780401600104.
- Abers, Rebecca (1998), "From Clientelism to Cooperation: Local Government, Participatory Policy, and Civic Organizing in Porto Alegrem Brazil", Politics & Society, 26 (4): 511–537, doi:10.1177/0032329298026004004, S2CID 154038651.
