= List of things named after Felix Hausdorff =

Felix Hausdorff (November 8, 1868 – January 26, 1942) was a German mathematician. He made significant contributions to mathematics, specifically in the fields of set theory and topology.

== Mathematics ==
- Baker–Campbell–Hausdorff formula
- Gromov–Hausdorff convergence
- Hausdorff–Young inequality
- Hausdorff completion
- Hausdorff dimension
- Hausdorff distance
- Hausdorff gap
- Hausdorff maximal principle
- Hausdorff measure
- Hausdorff Medal
- Hausdorff moment problem
- Hausdorff paradox
- Hausdorff space

== Places ==
- Felix Hausdorff International Meeting Centre at the University of Greifswald
- Hausdorff Center for Mathematics

== Space ==
- 24947 Hausdorff
