= Chabauty topology =

Topological structure introduced in 1950 by Claude Chabauty

In mathematics, the Chabauty topology is a certain topological structure introduced in 1950 by Claude Chabauty, on the set of all closed subgroups of a locally compact group G. It is closely related to the Fell topology on the set of all closed subsets of G and to the Hausdorff distance.

Intuitively, two closed subgroups of G are close in the Chabauty topology if, within any compact subset of G, every point of one subgroup is close to some point of the other, and vice versa. For instance, if $(\alpha_n)$ is a sequence of positive real numbers, then the sequence of lattices $\alpha_n\mathbb{Z}$ in the additive group $\mathbb{R}$ converges to

- $\alpha\mathbb{Z}$ if $\alpha_n \to \alpha$ with $\alpha\neq 0$,
- $\mathbb{R}$ if $\alpha_n \to 0$,
- the trivial subgroup $\{0\}$ if $\alpha_n \to \infty$.

Chabauty's original motivation was to study limit groups of lattices in $\mathbb{R}^n$.

== Definition ==
We begin by defining a topology on the set of all closed subset of G. This is given by defining a neighbourhood basis for any closed subset X of G. Elements of the neighbourhood basis are given by

$V(X;C,U) = \{ Y \subset G \text { closed } \mid Y\cap C \subseteq UX \text{ and } X\cap C \subseteq UY \},$

where C is any compact subset of G and U is any open neighbourhood U of the identity. The topology determined by this neighbourhood basis is the same as the Fell topology, and the set $\mathrm{Subgp}(G)$ of closed subgroups of G is a closed subset in this topology. The inherited topology is called the Chabauty topology, and $\mathrm{Subgp}(G)$ with this topology is called the Chabauty space.

== Examples ==
The Chabauty space of the group $\mathbb{R}$ is homeomorphic to the closed interval $[0,\infty]$ via the map

$$\alpha \mapsto
\begin{cases}
\mathbb{R}, & \text{if } \alpha = 0,\\
\alpha\mathbb{Z}, & \text{if } 0<\alpha<\infty, \\
\{0\}, & \text{if } \alpha=\infty.
\end{cases}$$

The Chabauty space of $\mathbb{R}^2$ is homemorphic to a 4-sphere. The Chabauty space of $\mathbb{R}^n$ for $n>2$ becomes more complicated.

== Relation to other topologies ==
The definition Chabauty topology can be used to define a uniform structure on the set $\mathrm{\mathcal{F}(G)}$ of all closed subsets of G. Namely, the sets

$\mathcal{V}(C,U) = \{ (X,Y) \in \mathcal{F}(G)^2 \mid X \cap C \subseteq UY \text{ and } Y\cap C \subseteq UX \},$ define a set of entourages for $\mathcal{F}(G)$, where C and U vary over the compact subsets of G and the open neighbourhoods of the identity, respectively. The induced topology of this uniform structure is the Chabauty topology.

If the topology of G is first countable, then G can be endowed with a left-invariant metric which induces the topology. In this case, a series of closed subgroups converges in the Chabauty topology if and only if their intersections with any compact subset converge with respect to the Hausdorff distance.
