= Maarten Solleveld =

Dutch chess grandmaster and mathematician (born 1979)

Personal information
- Born: February 5, 1979 (age 47) Amsterdam, Netherlands

Chess career
- Country: Netherlands
- Title: Grandmaster (2012)
- FIDE rating: 2492 (October 2026)
- Peak rating: 2536 (May 2012)

Maarten Solleveld is a Dutch chess grandmaster and mathematician.

== Chess career ==
He won the 2000 Gouda Open ahead of IM Johan van Mil.

He achieved his GM norms at the:

- Dutch Team Championship in June 2003
- North Sea Cup in July 2005
- Dutch Team Competition in April 2012

He plays online speed chess tournaments on the website Chess.com. His account was closed in October 2026 for fair play violations.

== Mathematics career ==
He obtained his PhD in mathematics from the University of Amsterdam in 2007 under Eric Opdam. He has held teaching positions at University of Amsterdam, Hausdorff Center for Mathematics, and University of Göttingen. In 2011, he became a professor of mathematics at Radboud University Nijmegen.
