= Stochastic homogenization =

In homogenization theory, a branch of mathematics, stochastic homogenization is a technique for understanding solutions to partial differential equations with oscillatory random coefficients.
