= Kuratowski convergence =

In mathematics, Kuratowski convergence or Painlevé-Kuratowski convergence is a notion of convergence for subsets of a topological space. First introduced by Paul Painlevé in lectures on mathematical analysis in 1902, the concept was popularized in texts by Felix Hausdorff and Kazimierz Kuratowski. Intuitively, the Kuratowski limit of a sequence of sets is where the sets "accumulate".

== Definitions ==
For a given sequence $\{x_n\}_{n=1}^{\infty}$ of points in a space $X$, a limit point of the sequence can be understood as any point $x \in X$ where the sequence eventually becomes arbitrarily close to $x$. On the other hand, a cluster point of the sequence can be thought of as a point $x \in X$ where the sequence frequently becomes arbitrarily close to $x$. The Kuratowski limits inferior and superior generalize this intuition of limit and cluster points to subsets of the given space $X$.

=== Metric Spaces ===
Let $(X,d)$ be a metric space, where $X$ is a given set. For any point $x$ and any non-empty subset $A \subset X$, define the distance between the point and the subset:

$$d(x, A) := \inf_{y \in A} d(x, y), \qquad x \in X.$$

For any sequence of subsets $\{A_n\}_{n=1}^{\infty}$ of $X$, the Kuratowski limit inferior (or lower closed limit) of $A_n$ as $n \to \infty$; is
$$\begin{align}
\mathop{\mathrm{Li}} A_{n} :=&
\left\{ x \in X : \begin{matrix} \mbox{for all open neighbourhoods } U \mbox{ of } x,  U \cap A_{n} \neq \varnothing \mbox{ for large enough } n \end{matrix} \right\} \\
=&\left\{ x \in X : \limsup_{n \to \infty} d(x, A_{n}) = 0 \right\};
\end{align}$$
the Kuratowski limit superior (or upper closed limit) of $A_n$ as $n \to \infty$; is
$$\begin{align}
\mathop{\mathrm{Ls}} A_{n} :=&
\left\{ x \in X : \begin{matrix} \mbox{for all open neighbourhoods } U \mbox{ of } x, U \cap A_{n} \neq \varnothing \mbox{ for infinitely many } n \end{matrix} \right\} \\
=&\left\{ x \in X : \liminf_{n \to \infty} d(x, A_{n}) = 0 \right\};
\end{align}$$
If the Kuratowski limits inferior and superior agree, then the common set is called the Kuratowski limit of $A_n$ and is denoted $\mathop{\mathrm{Lim}}_{n \to \infty} A_n$.

=== Topological Spaces ===
If $(X, \tau)$ is a topological space, and $\{A_i\}_{i \in I}$ are a net of subsets of $X$, the limits inferior and superior follow a similar construction. For a given point $x \in X$ denote $\mathcal{N}(x)$ the collection of open neighborhoods of $x$. The Kuratowski limit inferior of $\{A_i\}_{i \in I}$ is the set
$$\mathop{\mathrm{Li}} A_i := \left\{
x \in X :
\forall U \in \mathcal{N}(x) \, \exists i_0 \in I \colon \forall i \geq i_0 \Rightarrow U \cap A_i \neq \varnothing
\right\},$$
and the Kuratowski limit superior is the set
$$\mathop{\mathrm{Ls}} A_i := \left\{
x \in X :
\forall U \in \mathcal{N}(x) \, \forall i_0 \in I \, \exists i \geq i_0 \colon U \cap A_i \neq \varnothing
\right\}.$$
Elements of $\mathop{\mathrm{Li}} A_i$ are called limit points of $\{A_i\}_{i \in I}$ and elements of $\mathop{\mathrm{Ls}} A_i$ are called cluster points of $\{A_i\}_{i \in I}$. In other words, $x$ is a limit point of $\{A_i\}_{i \in I}$ if each of its neighborhoods intersects $A_i$ for all $i$ in a "residual" subset of $I$, while $x$ is a cluster point of $\{A_i\}_{i \in I}$ if each of its neighborhoods intersects $A_i$ for all $i$ in a cofinal subset of $I$.

When these sets agree, the common set is the Kuratowski limit of $\{A_i\}_{i \in I}$, denoted $\mathop{\mathrm{Lim}} A_i$.

== Examples ==
- Suppose $(X, d)$ is separable where $X$ is a perfect set, and let $D = \{d_1, d_2, \dots\}$ be an enumeration of a countable dense subset of $X$. Then the sequence $\{A_n\}_{n=1}^{\infty}$ defined by $A_n := \{d_1, d_2, \dots, d_n\}$ has $\mathop{\mathrm{Lim}} A_n = X$.
- Given two closed subsets $B, C \subset X$, defining $A_{2n-1} := B$ and $A_{2n} := C$ for each $n=1,2,\dots$ yields $\mathop{\mathrm{Li}} A_n = B \cap C$ and $\mathop{\mathrm{Ls}} A_n = B \cup C$.
- The sequence of closed balls $A_n := \{y \in X: d(x_n,y) \leq r_n\}$converges in the sense of Kuratowski when $x_n \to x$ in $X$ and $r_n \to r$ in $[0, +\infty)$, and in particular, $\mathop{\mathrm{Lim}}(A_n) = \{y \in X : d(x,y) \leq r\}$. If $r_n \to +\infty$, then $\mathop{\mathrm{Lim}} A_n = X$ while $\mathop{\mathrm{Lim}}(X \setminus A_n) = \emptyset$.
- Let $A_{n} := \{ x \in \mathbb{R} : \sin (n x) = 0 \}$. Then $A_n$ converges in the Kuratowski sense to the entire line.
- In a topological vector space, if $\{A_n\}_{n=1}^{\infty}$ is a sequence of cones, then so are the Kuratowski limits superior and inferior. For example, the sets $A_n := \{(x,y) \in \mathbb{R}^2 : y \geq n|x|\}$ converge to $\{(0,y) \in \mathbb{R}^2 : y \geq 0\}$.

== Properties ==
The following properties hold for the limits inferior and superior in both the metric and topological contexts, but are stated in the metric formulation for ease of reading.

- Both $\mathop{\mathrm{Li}} A_n$ and $\mathop{\mathrm{Ls}} A_n$ are closed subsets of $X$, and $\mathop{\mathrm{Li}} A_n \subset \mathop{\mathrm{Ls}} A_n$ always holds.
- The upper and lower limits do not distinguish between sets and their closures: $\mathop{\mathrm{Li}} A_n = \mathop{\mathrm{Li}} \mathop{\mathrm{cl}}(A_n)$ and $\mathop{\mathrm{Ls}} A_n = \mathop{\mathrm{L s}} \mathop{\mathrm{cl}}(A_n)$.
- If $A_n := A$ is a constant sequence, then $\mathop{\mathrm{Lim}} A_n = \mathop{\mathrm{cl}} A$.
- If $A_n := \{x_n\}$ is a sequence of singletons, then $\mathop{\mathrm{Li}} A_n$ and $\mathop{\mathrm{Ls}} A_n$ consist of the limit points and cluster points, respectively, of the sequence $\{x_n\}_{n=1}^{\infty} \subset X$.
- If $A_n \subset B_n \subset C_n$ and $B := \mathop{\mathrm{Lim}} A_n = \mathop{\mathrm{Lim}} C_n$, then $\mathop{\mathrm{Lim}} B_n = B$.
- (Hit and miss criteria) For a closed subset $A \subset X$, one has
  - $A \subset \mathop{\mathrm{Li}} A_n$, if and only if for every open set $U \subset X$ with $A \cap U \ne \emptyset$ there exists $n_0$ such that $A_n \cap U \ne \emptyset$ for all $n_0 \leq n$,
  - $\mathop{\mathrm{Ls}} A_n \subset A$, if and only if for every compact set $K \subset X$ with $A \cap K = \emptyset$ there exists $n_0$ such that $A_n \cap K = \emptyset$ for all $n_0 \leq n$.
- If $A_1 \subset A_2 \subset A_3 \subset \cdots$ then the Kuratowski limit exists, and $\mathop{\mathrm{Lim}} A_n = \mathop{\mathrm{cl}} \left( \bigcup_{n = 1}^{\infty} A_n \right)$. Conversely, if $A_1 \supset A_2 \supset A_3 \supset \cdots$ then the Kuratowski limit exists, and $\mathop{\mathrm{Lim}} A_n = \bigcap_{n = 1}^{\infty} \mathop{\mathrm{cl}}(A_n)$.
- If $d_H$ denotes Hausdorff metric, then $d_H(A_n, A) \to 0$ implies $\mathop{\mathrm{cl}}A = \mathop{\mathrm{Lim}} A_n$. However, noncompact closed sets may converge in the sense of Kuratowski while $d_H(A_n, \mathop{\mathrm{Lim}} A_n) = +\infty$ for each $n=1,2,\dots$
- Convergence in the sense of Kuratowski is weaker than convergence in the sense of Vietoris but equivalent to convergence in the sense of Fell. If $X$ is compact, then these are all equivalent and agree with convergence in Hausdorff metric.

== Kuratowski Continuity of Set-Valued Functions ==
Let $S : X \rightrightarrows Y$ be a set-valued function between the spaces $X$ and $Y$; namely, $S(x) \in Y$ for all $x \in X$. Denote $S^{-1}(y) = \{x \in X : y \in S(x)\}$. We can define the operators
$$\begin{align}
\mathop{\mathrm{Li}}_{x' \to x} S(x') :=& \bigcap_{x' \to x} \mathop{\mathrm{Li}} S(x'), \qquad x \in X \\
\mathop{\mathrm{Ls}}_{x' \to x} S(x') :=& \bigcup_{x' \to x} \mathop{\mathrm{Ls}} S(x'), \qquad x \in X\\
\end{align}$$
where $x' \to x$ means convergence in sequences when $X$ is metrizable and convergence in nets otherwise. Then,

- $S$ is inner semi-continuous at $x \in X$ if $S(x) \subset \mathop{\mathrm{Li}}_{x' \to x} S(x')$;
- $S$ is outer semi-continuous at $x \in X$ if $\mathop{\mathrm{Ls}}_{x' \to x} S(x') \subset S(x)$.

When $S$ is both inner and outer semi-continuous at $x \in X$, we say that $S$ is continuous (or continuous in the sense of Kuratowski).

Continuity of set-valued functions is commonly defined in terms of lower- and upper-hemicontinuity popularized by Berge. In this sense, a set-valued function is continuous if and only if the function $f_S : X \to 2^Y$ defined by $f(x) = S(x)$ is continuous with respect to the Vietoris hyperspace topology of $2^Y$. For set-valued functions with closed values, continuity in the sense of Vietoris-Berge is stronger than continuity in the sense of Kuratowski.

=== Examples ===
- The set-valued function $B(x,r) = \{y \in X : d(x,y) \leq r \}$ is continuous $X \times [0,+\infty) \rightrightarrows X$.
- Given a function $f : X \to [-\infty, +\infty]$, the superlevel set mapping $S_f(x) := \{\lambda \in \mathbb{R} : f(x) \leq \lambda\}$ is outer semi-continuous at $x$, if and only if $f$ is lower semi-continuous at $x$. Similarly, $S_f$ is inner semi-continuous at $x$, if and only if $f$ is upper semi-continuous at $x$.

=== Properties ===
- If $S$ is continuous at $x$, then $S(x)$ is closed.
- $S$ is outer semi-continuous at $x$, if and only if for every $y \notin S(x)$ there are neighborhoods $V \in \mathcal{N}(y)$ and $U \in \mathcal{N}(x)$ such that $U \cap S^{-1}(V) = \emptyset$.
- $S$ is inner semi-continuous at $x$, if and only if for every $y \in S(x)$ and neighborhood $V \in \mathcal{N}(y)$ there is a neighborhood $U \in \mathcal{N}(x)$ such that $V \cap S(x') \ne \emptyset$ for all $x' \in U$.
- $S$ is (globally) outer semi-continuous, if and only if its graph $\{(x,y) \in X \times Y : y \in S(x)\}$ is closed.
- (Relations to Vietoris-Berge continuity). Suppose $S(x)$ is closed.
  - $S$ is inner semi-continuous at $x$, if and only if $S$ is lower hemi-continuous at $x$ in the sense of Vietoris-Berge.
  - If $S$ is upper hemi-continuous at $x$, then $S$ is outer semi-continuous at $x$. The converse is false in general, but holds when $Y$ is a compact space.
- If $S : \mathbb{R}^n \to \mathbb{R}^m$has a convex graph, then $S$ is inner semi-continuous at each point of the interior of the domain of $S$. Conversely, given any inner semi-continuous set-valued function $S$, the convex hull mapping $T(x) := \mathop{\mathrm{conv}} S(x)$ is also inner semi-continuous.

== Epi-convergence and Γ-convergence ==
For the metric space $(X, d)$ a sequence of functions $f_n : X \to [-\infty, +\infty]$, the epi-limit inferior (or lower epi-limit) is the function $\mathop{\mathrm{e}\liminf} f_n$ defined by the epigraph equation
$$\mathop{\mathrm{epi}} \left( \mathop{\mathrm{e}\liminf} f_n\right) := \mathop{\mathrm{Ls}} \left(\mathop{\mathrm{epi}} f_n\right),$$
and similarly the epi-limit superior (or upper epi-limit) is the function $\mathop{\mathrm{e}\limsup} f_n$ defined by the epigraph equation
$$\mathop{\mathrm{epi}} \left( \mathop{\mathrm{e}\limsup} f_n\right)
:= \mathop{\mathrm{Li}} \left(\mathop{\mathrm{epi}} f_n\right).$$
Since Kuratowski upper and lower limits are closed sets, it follows that both $\mathop{\mathrm{e}\liminf} f_n$ and $\mathop{\mathrm{e}\limsup} f_n$ are lower semi-continuous functions. Similarly, since $\mathop{\mathrm{Li}} \mathop{\mathrm{epi}} f_n \subset \mathop{\mathrm{Ls}} \mathop{\mathrm{epi}} f_n$, it follows that $\mathop{\mathrm{e}\liminf} f_n \leq \mathop{\mathrm{e}\liminf} f_n$ uniformly. These functions agree, if and only if $\mathop{\mathrm{Lim}} \mathop{\mathrm{epi}} f_n$ exists, and the associated function is called the epi-limit of $\{f_n\}_{n=1}^{\infty}$.

When $(X, \tau)$ is a topological space, epi-convergence of the sequence $\{f_n\}_{n=1}^{\infty}$ is called Γ-convergence. From the perspective of Kuratowski convergence there is no distinction between epi-limits and Γ-limits. The concepts are usually studied separately, because epi-convergence admits special characterizations that rely on the metric space structure of $X$, which does not hold in topological spaces generally.

== See also ==
- Set-theoretic limit
- Borel–Cantelli lemma, but note that set-theoretic limits and Kuratowski limits do not agree.
- Wijsman convergence
- Hausdorff distance
- Hemicontinuity
- Vietoris topology
- Epi-convergence
- Gamma convergence
