= Hypertopology =

In the mathematical branch of topology, a hyperspace (or a space equipped with a hypertopology) is a topological space, which consists of the set CL(X) of all non-empty closed subsets of another topological space X, equipped with a topology so that the canonical map

$i : x \mapsto \overline{\{x\}},$

is a homeomorphism onto its image. As a consequence, a copy of the original space X lives inside its hyperspace CL(X).

Early examples of hypertopology include the Hausdorff metric and Vietoris topology.

== Notation ==
Various notation is used by different authors to denote the set of all closed subsets of a topological space X, including CL(X), $\mathcal{F}(X)$ and $2^X$.

== Examples ==
=== Vietoris topology ===
Let $F$ be a closed subset and $U_1,\ldots,U_n$ be a finite collection of open subsets of X. Define

$V(F,U_1,\ldots,U_n) = \{ Y \subseteq X \text{ closed} \mid Y \cap F = \emptyset \text{ and } Y\cap U_i \neq \emptyset \text{ for every }1\leq i\leq n \}.$

These sets form a basis for a topology on CL(X), called the Vietoris or finite topology, named for Leopold Vietoris.

=== Fell topology ===
A variant on the Vietoris topology is to allow only the sets $V(C,U_1,\ldots,U_n)$ where C is a compact subset of X and $U_1,\ldots,U_n$ a finite collection of open subsets. This is again a base for a topology on CL(X) called the Fell topology or the H-topology. Note, though, that the canonical map $i:x \mapsto \overline{\{x\}}$ is a homeomorphism onto its image if and only if X is Hausdorff, so for non-Hausdorff X, the Fell topology is not a hypertopology in the sense of this article.

The Vietoris and Fell topologies coincide if X is a compact space, but have quite different properties if not. For instance, the Fell topology is always compact and it is compact Hausdorff whenever if X is locally compact. On the other hand, the Vietoris topology is compact if and only if X is compact and Hausdorff if and only if X is regular.

=== Other constructions ===
The Hausdorff distance on the closed subsets of a bounded metric space X induces a topology on CL(X). If X is a compact metric space, this agrees with the Vietoris and Fell topologies.

The Chabauty topology on the closed subsets of a locally compact group coincides with the Fell topology.

== See also ==
- Hausdorff distance
- Kuratowski convergence
- Wijsman convergence
- Chabauty topology
