= Asymptotic homogenization =

Method of studying partial differential equations

In mathematics and physics, homogenization is a method of studying partial differential equations with rapidly oscillating coefficients, such as

$$\nabla\cdot\left(A\left(\frac{\vec x}{\epsilon}\right)\nabla u_{\epsilon}\right) = f$$

where $\epsilon$ is a very small parameter and $A\left(\vec y\right)$ is a 1-periodic coefficient: $A\left(\vec y+\vec e_i\right)=A\left(\vec y\right)$, $i=1,\dots, n$.

It turns out that the study of these equations is also of great importance in physics and engineering, since equations of this type govern the physics of inhomogeneous or heterogeneous materials. Of course, all matter is inhomogeneous at some scale, but frequently it is convenient to treat it as homogeneous. A good example is the continuum concept which is used in continuum mechanics. Under this assumption, materials such as fluids, solids, etc. can be treated as homogeneous materials and associated with these materials are material properties such as shear modulus, elastic moduli, etc.

Frequently, inhomogeneous materials (such as composite materials) possess microstructure and therefore they are subjected to loads or forcings which vary on a length scale which is far bigger than the characteristic length scale of the microstructure. In this situation, one can often replace the equation above with an equation of the form

$$\nabla\cdot\left(A^*\nabla u\right) = f$$

where $A^*$ is a constant tensor coefficient and is known as the effective property associated with the material in question. It can be explicitly computed as

$$A^*_{ij}=\int_{(0,1)^n} A(\vec y)\left(
\nabla w_j(\vec y)+\vec e_j\right)
\cdot\vec e_i\, dy_1\dots dy_n , \qquad i,j=1,\dots,n$$

from 1-periodic functions $w_j$ satisfying:

$$\nabla_y\cdot\left(A(\vec y)\nabla w_j\right)=
-\nabla_y\cdot\left(A(\vec y)\vec e_j\right).$$

This process of replacing an equation with a highly oscillatory coefficient with one with a homogeneous (uniform) coefficient is known as homogenization. This subject is inextricably linked with the subject of micromechanics for this very reason.

In homogenization one equation is replaced by another if $u_\epsilon\approx u$ for small enough $\epsilon$, provided $u_\epsilon\to u$ in some appropriate norm as $\epsilon\to 0$.

As a result of the above, homogenization can therefore be viewed as an extension of the continuum concept to materials which possess microstructure. The analogue of the differential element in the continuum concept (which contains enough atom, or molecular structure to be representative of that material), is known as the "Representative Volume Element" in homogenization and micromechanics. This element contains enough statistical information about the inhomogeneous medium in order to be representative of the material. Therefore, averaging over this element gives an effective property such as $A^*$ above.

Classical results of homogenization theory were obtained for media with periodic microstructure modeled by partial differential equations with periodic coefficients. These results were later generalized to spatially homogeneous random media modeled by differential equations with random coefficients which statistical properties are the same at every point in space. In practice, many applications require a more general way of modeling that is neither periodic nor statistically homogeneous. For this end the methods of the homogenization theory have been extended to partial differential equations, which coefficients are neither periodic nor statistically homogeneous (so-called arbitrarily rough coefficients).

== The method of asymptotic homogenization ==
Mathematical homogenization theory dates back to the French, Russian and Italian schools. The method of asymptotic homogenization proceeds by introducing the fast variable $\vec y=\vec x/\epsilon$ and posing a formal expansion in $\epsilon$:

$$u_\epsilon(\vec x) = u(\vec x,\vec y) = u_0(\vec x,\vec y)+
\epsilon u_1(\vec x,\vec y)+\epsilon^2 u_2(\vec x,\vec y)+O(\epsilon^3)\,$$

which generates a hierarchy of problems. The homogenized equation is obtained and the effective coefficients are determined by solving the so-called "cell problems" for the function $u_1(\vec x,\vec x/\epsilon)$.

== See also ==
- Asymptotic analysis
- Γ-convergence
- Mosco convergence
- Effective medium approximations
