= Babenko–Beckner inequality =

Theorem of Fourier analysis

In mathematics, the Babenko–Beckner inequality (after Konstantin I. Babenko and William E. Beckner) is a sharpened form of the Hausdorff–Young inequality having applications to uncertainty principles in the Fourier analysis of L^{p} spaces. The (q, p)-norm of the n-dimensional Fourier transform is defined to be

$$\|\mathcal F\|_{q,p} = \sup_{f\in L^p(\mathbb R^n)} \frac{\|\mathcal Ff\|_q}{\|f\|_p},\text{ where }1 < p \le 2,\text{ and }\frac 1 p + \frac 1 q = 1.$$

In 1961, Babenko found this norm for even integer values of q. Finally, in 1975, using Hermite functions as eigenfunctions of the Fourier transform, Beckner proved that the value of this norm for all $q \ge 2$ is

$$\|\mathcal F\|_{q,p} = \left(p^{1/p}/q^{1/q}\right)^{n/2}.$$

Thus we have the Babenko–Beckner inequality that

$$\|\mathcal Ff\|_q \le \left(p^{1/p}/q^{1/q}\right)^{n/2} \|f\|_p.$$

To write this out explicitly, (in the case of one dimension,) if the Fourier transform is normalized so that

$$g(y) \approx \int_{\mathbb R} e^{-2\pi ixy} f(x)\,dx\text{ and }f(x) \approx \int_{\mathbb R} e^{2\pi ixy} g(y)\,dy,$$

then we have

$$\left(\int_{\mathbb R} |g(y)|^q \,dy\right)^{1/q} \le \left(p^{1/p}/q^{1/q}\right)^{1/2} \left(\int_{\mathbb R} |f(x)|^p \,dx\right)^{1/p}$$

or more simply

$$\left(\sqrt q \int_{\mathbb R} |g(y)|^q \,dy\right)^{1/q}
\le \left(\sqrt p \int_{\mathbb R} |f(x)|^p \,dx\right)^{1/p}.$$

== Main ideas of proof ==
Throughout this sketch of a proof, let

$$1 < p \le 2, \quad \frac 1 p + \frac 1 q = 1, \quad \text{and} \quad \omega = \sqrt{1-p} = i\sqrt{p-1}.$$

(Except for q, we will more or less follow the notation of Beckner.)

=== The two-point lemma ===
Let $d\nu(x)$ be the discrete measure with weight $1/2$ at the points $x = \pm 1.$ Then the operator

$$C:a+bx \rightarrow a + \omega bx$$

maps $L^p(d\nu)$ to $L^q(d\nu)$ with norm 1; that is,

$$\left[\int|a+\omega bx|^q d\nu(x)\right]^{1/q} \le \left[\int|a+bx|^p d\nu(x)\right]^{1/p},$$

or more explicitly,

$$\left[\frac {|a+\omega b|^q + |a-\omega b|^q} 2 \right]^{1/q}
\le \left[\frac {|a+b|^p + |a-b|^p} 2 \right]^{1/p}$$

for any complex a, b. (See Beckner's paper for the proof of his "two-point lemma".)

=== A sequence of Bernoulli trials ===
The measure $d\nu$ that was introduced above is actually a fair Bernoulli trial with mean 0 and variance 1. Consider the sum of a sequence of n such Bernoulli trials, independent and normalized so that the standard deviation remains 1. We obtain the measure $d\nu_n(x)$ which is the n-fold convolution of $d\nu(\sqrt n x)$ with itself. The next step is to extend the operator C defined on the two-point space above to an operator defined on the (n + 1)-point space of $d\nu_n(x)$ with respect to the elementary symmetric polynomials.

=== Convergence to standard normal distribution ===
The sequence $d\nu_n(x)$ converges weakly to the standard normal probability distribution $d\mu(x) = \frac{1}{\sqrt{2\pi}} e^{-x^2/2}\, dx$ with respect to functions of polynomial growth. In the limit, the extension of the operator C above in terms of the elementary symmetric polynomials with respect to the measure $d\nu_n(x)$ is expressed as an operator T in terms of the Hermite polynomials with respect to the standard normal distribution. These Hermite functions are the eigenfunctions of the Fourier transform, and the (q, p)-norm of the Fourier transform is obtained as a result after some renormalization.

== See also ==
- Entropic uncertainty
