= Felix Hausdorff =

German mathematician (1868–1942)

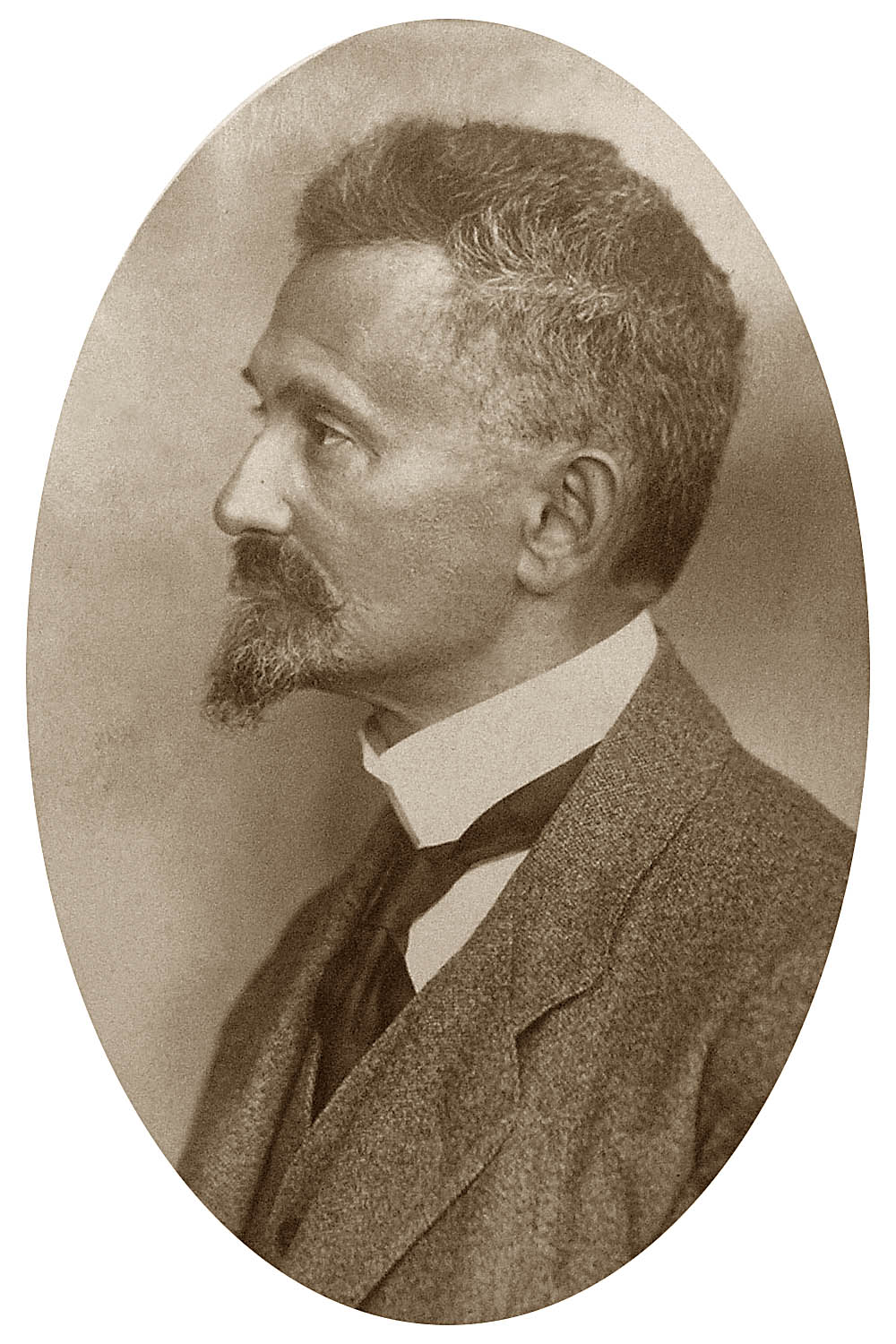
- Born: November 8, 1868; Breslau, Kingdom of Prussia, North German Confederation
- Died: January 26, 1942 (aged 73); Bonn
- Education: University of Leipzig
- Known for: η set; Back-and-forth method; Baker–Campbell–Hausdorff formula; Haussdorff's Border; Hausdorff completion; Hausdorff dimension; Hausdorff distance; Hausdorff gap; Hausdorff maximal principle; Hausdorff measure; Hausdorff paradox; Hausdorff space; Hausdorff moment problem; Hausdorff–Young inequality
- Spouse: Charlotte Hausdorff (1873-1942)
- Scientific career
- Fields: Mathematics
- Workplaces: University of Bonn, University of Greifswald, University of Leipzig
- Thesis: Zur Theorie der astronomischen Strahlenbrechung (1891)
- Doctoral advisor: Heinrich Bruns; Adolph Mayer

Felix Hausdorff (/ˈhaʊsdɔːrf/ HOWS-dorf, /ˈhaʊzdɔːrf/ HOWZ-dorf; November 8, 1868 – January 26, 1942) was a German mathematician, pseudonym Paul Mongré (à mon gré (Fr.) = "according to my taste"), who is considered to be one of the founders of modern topology and who contributed significantly to set theory, descriptive set theory, measure theory, and functional analysis.

Hausdorff was Jewish, and life became difficult for him and his family after the Kristallnacht of 1938. The next year he initiated efforts to emigrate to the United States, but was unable to make arrangements to receive a research fellowship. On 26 January 1942, Hausdorff, along with his wife and his sister-in-law, died by suicide by taking an overdose of veronal, rather than comply with German orders to move to a concentration camp in Endenich.

== Life ==
=== Childhood and youth ===
Hausdorff's father, the Jewish merchant Louis Hausdorff (1843–1896), moved with his young family to Leipzig in the autumn of 1870, and over time worked at various companies, including a linen-and cotton goods factory. He was an educated man and had become a Morenu at the age of 14. He wrote several treatises, including a long work on the Aramaic translations of the Bible from the perspective of Talmudic law.

Hausdorff's mother, Hedwig (1848–1902), who is also referred to in various documents as Johanna, came from the Jewish Tietz family. From another branch of this family came Hermann Tietz, founder of the first department store, and later co-owner of the department store chain called "Hermann Tietz". During the period of Nazi dictatorship the name was "Aryanised" to Hertie.

From 1878 to 1887 Felix Hausdorff attended the Old St Nicholas School, Leipzig, a facility that had a reputation as a hotbed of humanistic education. He was an excellent student, class leader for many years and often recited self-written Latin or German poems at school celebrations.

In his later years of high school, choosing a main subject of study was not easy for Hausdorff. Magda Dierkesmann, who was often a guest in the home of Hausdorff in the years 1926–1932, reported in 1967 that:

His versatile musical talent was so great that only the insistence of his father made him give up his plan to study music and become a composer.

He decided to study the natural sciences, and in his graduating class of 1887 he was the only one who achieved the highest possible grade.

=== Degree, doctorate and Habilitation ===
From 1887 to 1891 Hausdorff studied mathematics and astronomy, mainly in his native city of Leipzig, interrupted by one semester in Freiburg (summer 1888) and Berlin (winter 1888/1889). Surviving testimony from other students depict him as an extremely versatile and interested young man, who, in addition to the mathematical and astronomical lectures, attended lectures in physics, chemistry and geography, and also lectures on philosophy and history of philosophy, as well as on issues of language, literature and social sciences. In Leipzig he attended lectures on the history of music from musicologist Oscar Paul. His early love of music lasted a lifetime; in Hausdorff's home he held impressive musical evenings with the landlord at the piano, according to witness statements made by various participants. Even as a student in Leipzig, he was an admirer and connoisseur of the music of Richard Wagner.

In later semesters of his studies, Hausdorff was close to Heinrich Bruns (1848–1919). Bruns was professor of astronomy and director of the observatory at the University of Leipzig. Under his supervision, Hausdorff graduated in 1891 with a work on the theory of astronomical refraction of light in the atmosphere. Two publications on the same subject followed, and in 1895 his Habilitation also followed with a thesis on the absorbance of light in the atmosphere. These early astronomical works of Hausdorff, despite their excellent mathematical formulation, were ultimately of little importance to the scientific community. For one, the underlying idea of Bruns was later shown to not be viable (there was a need for refraction observations near the astronomical horizon, and as Julius Bauschinger would show, this could not be obtained with the required accuracy). And further, the progress in the direct measurement of atmospheric data (from weather balloon ascents) has since made the painstaking accuracy of this data from refraction observations unnecessary. In the time between defending his PhD and his Habilitation, Hausdorff completed his yearlong military requirement, and worked for two years as a human computer at the observatory in Leipzig.

=== Lecturer in Leipzig ===
After his Habilitation, Hausdorff became a lecturer at the University of Leipzig where he began extensive teaching in a variety of mathematical areas. In addition to teaching and research in mathematics, he also pursued his literary and philosophical inclinations. A man of varied interests, he often associated with a number of famous writers, artists and publishers such as Hermann Conradi, Richard Dehmel, Otto Erich Hartleben, Gustav Kirstein, Max Klinger, Max Reger and Frank Wedekind. The years of 1897 to 1904 mark the high point of his literary and philosophical creativity, during which time 18 of his 22 pseudonymous works were published, including a book of poetry, a play, an epistemological book and a volume of aphorisms.

In 1899 Hausdorff married Charlotte Goldschmidt, the daughter of Jewish doctor Siegismund Goldschmidt. Her stepmother was the famous suffragist and preschool teacher Henriette Goldschmidt. Hausdorff's only child, his daughter Lenore (Nora), was born in 1900; she survived the era of National Socialism and enjoyed a long life, dying in Bonn in 1991.

=== First professorship ===
In December 1901 Hausdorff was appointed as adjunct associate professor at the University of Leipzig. An often-repeated factoid, that Hausdorff got a call from Göttingen and rejected it, cannot be verified and is most likely wrong. After considering Hausdorff's application to Leipzig, the Dean Kirchner felt compelled to make the following addition to the very positive vote from his colleagues, written by Heinrich Bruns:

The faculty, however, considers itself obliged to report to the Royal Ministry that the above application, considered on November 2nd of this year when a faculty meeting had taken place, was not accepted by all, but with 22 votes to 7. The minority was opposed, because Dr. Hausdorff is of the Mosaic faith.

This quote emphasizes the undisguised antisemitism present, which especially took a sharp upturn throughout the German Reich after the stock market crash of 1873. Leipzig was a focus of antisemitic sentiment, especially among the student body, which may well be the reason that Hausdorff did not feel at ease in Leipzig. Another contributing factor may also have been the stresses due to the hierarchical posturing of the Leipzig professors.

After his Habilitation, Hausdorff wrote other works on optics, on non-Euclidean geometry, and on hypercomplex number systems, as well as two papers on probability theory. However, his main area of work soon became set theory, especially the theory of ordered sets. Initially, it was only out of philosophical interest that Hausdorff began to study Georg Cantor's work, beginning around 1897, but already in 1901 Hausdorff began lecturing on set theory. His was one of the first ever lectures on set theory; only Ernst Zermelo's lectures in Göttingen College during the winter of 1900/1901 were earlier. That same year, he published his first paper on order types in which he examined a generalization of well-orderings called graded order types, where a linear order is graded if no two of its segments share the same order type. He generalized the Cantor–Bernstein theorem, which said the collection of countable order types has the cardinality of the continuum and showed that the collection of all graded types of an idempotent cardinality m has a cardinality of 2^{m}.

For the summer semester of 1910 Hausdorff was appointed as professor to the University of Bonn. There he began a lecture series on set theory, which he substantially revised and expanded for the summer semester of 1912.

In the summer of 1912 he also began work on his magnum opus, the book Grundzüge der Mengenlehre (Basics of set theory). It was completed in Greifswald, where Hausdorff had been appointed for the summer semester as full professor in 1913, and was released in April 1914.

The University of Greifswald was the smallest of the Prussian universities. The mathematical institute there was also small; during the summer of 1916 and the winter of 1916/17, Hausdorff was the only mathematician in Greifswald. This meant that he was almost fully occupied in teaching basic courses. It was thus a substantial improvement for his academic career when Hausdorff was appointed in 1921 to Bonn. There he was free to teach about wider ranges of topics, and often lectured on his latest research. He gave a particularly noteworthy lecture on probability theory (NL Hausdorff: Capsule 21: Fasz 64) in the summer semester of 1923, in which he grounded the theory of probability in measure-theoretic axiomatic theory, ten years before A. N. Kolmogorov's "Basic concepts of probability theory" (reprinted in full in the collected works, Volume V). In Bonn, Hausdorff was friends and colleagues with Eduard Study, and later with Otto Toeplitz, who were both outstanding mathematicians.

=== Under the Nazi dictatorship and suicide ===
After the takeover by the National Socialist party, antisemitism became state doctrine. Hausdorff was not initially concerned by the "Law for the Restoration of the Professional Civil Service", adopted in 1933, because he had been a German public servant since before 1914. However, he was not completely spared, as one of his lectures was interrupted by National Socialist student officials. In the winter semester of 1934/1935, there was a working session of the National Socialist German Student Union (NSDStB) at the University of Bonn, which chose "Race and Ethnicity" as their theme for the semester. Hausdorff cancelled his 1934/1935 winter semester Calculus III course on 20 November, and it is assumed that the choice of theme was related to the cancellation of Hausdorff's class, since in his long career as a university lecturer he had always taught his courses through to their end.

On March 31, 1935, after some back and forth, Hausdorff was finally given emeritus status. No words of thanks were given for his 40 years of successful work in the German higher education system.

His academic legacy shows that Hausdorff was still working mathematically during these increasingly difficult times, and continued to follow current developments of interest. He wrote, in addition to the expanded edition of his work on set theory, seven works on topology and descriptive set theory. These were published in Polish magazines: one in Studia Mathematica, the others in Fundamenta Mathematicae. He was supported at this time by Erich Bessel-Hagen, a loyal friend to the Hausdorff family who obtained books and magazines from the academic library, which Hausdorff was no longer allowed to enter.

A great deal is known about the humiliations to which Hausdorff and his family especially were exposed to after Kristallnacht in 1938. There are many sources, including the letters of Bessel-Hagen.

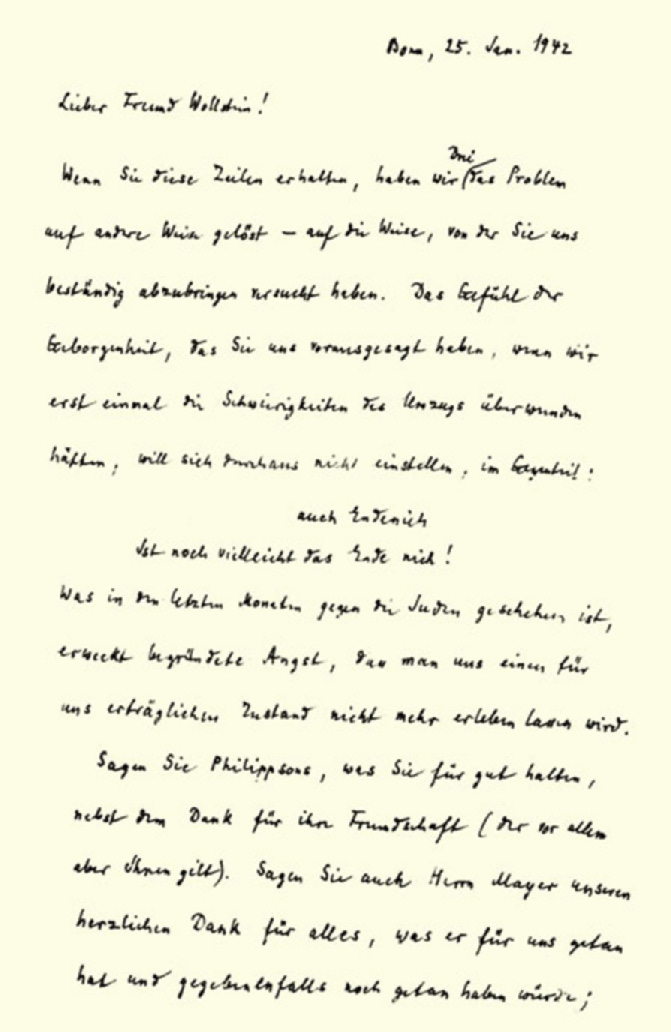
The first page of his farewell letter to Hans Wollstein

In 1939, Hausdorff asked the mathematician Richard Courant, in vain, for a research fellowship to be able to emigrate into the USA. In mid-1941, the Bonn Jews began to be deported to the "Monastery for Eternal Adoration" in Endenich, Bonn, from which the nuns had been expelled. Transports to death camps in the east occurred later. After Hausdorff, his wife, and his wife's sister, Edith Pappenheim (who was living with them), were ordered in January 1942 to move to the Endenich camp, the three died by suicide on 26 January 1942 by taking an overdose of veronal. Their final resting place is located on the cemetery Poppelsdorf in Bonn. In the time between their placement in temporary camps and his suicide, he gave his handwritten Nachlass to the Egyptologist and presbyter Hans Bonnet, who saved as much of them as possible, even despite the destruction of his house by a bomb.

Some of his fellow Jews may have had illusions about the camp Endenich, but not Hausdorff. In the estate of Bessel-Hagen, E. Neuenschwander discovered the farewell letter that Hausdorff wrote to his lawyer Hans Wollstein, who was also Jewish. Here is the beginning and end of the letter:

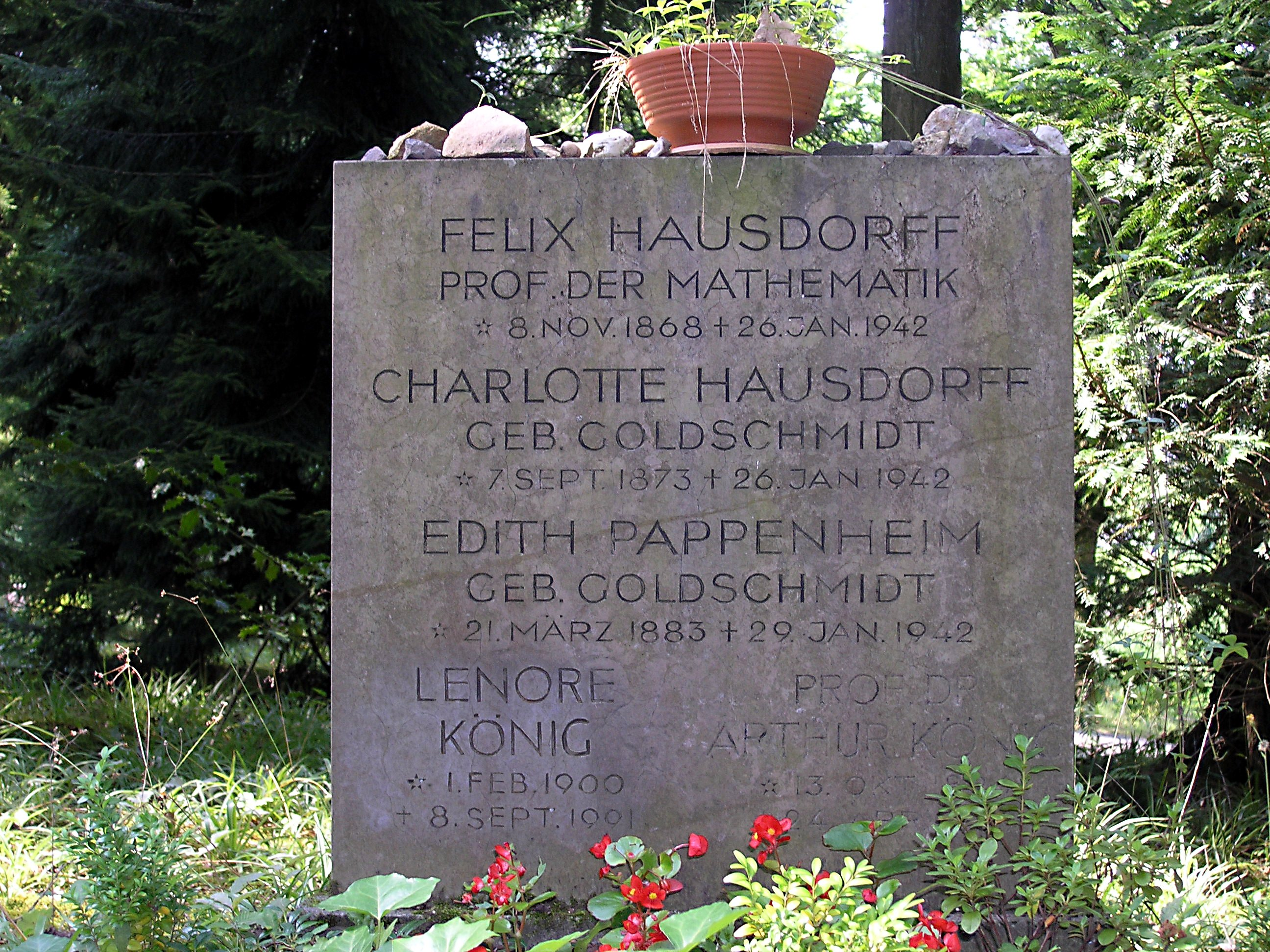
Hausdorff's gravestone in Bonn-Poppelsdorf

Dear friend Wollstein!

If you receive these lines, we (three) have solved the problem in a different manner — in the manner of which you have constantly tried to dissuade us. The feeling of security that you have predicted for us once we would overcome the difficulties of the move, is still eluding us; on the contrary, Endenich may not even be the end!

What has happened in recent months against the Jews evokes justified fear that they will not let us live to see a more bearable situation.

After thanking friends and, in great composure, expressing his last wishes regarding his funeral and his will, Hausdorff writes:

I am sorry that we cause you yet more effort beyond death, and I am convinced that you are doing what you can do (which perhaps is not very much). Forgive us our desertion! We wish you and all our friends to experience better times.

Your truly devoted

Felix Hausdorff

Unfortunately, this desire was not fulfilled. Hausdorff's lawyer, Wollstein, was murdered in Auschwitz.

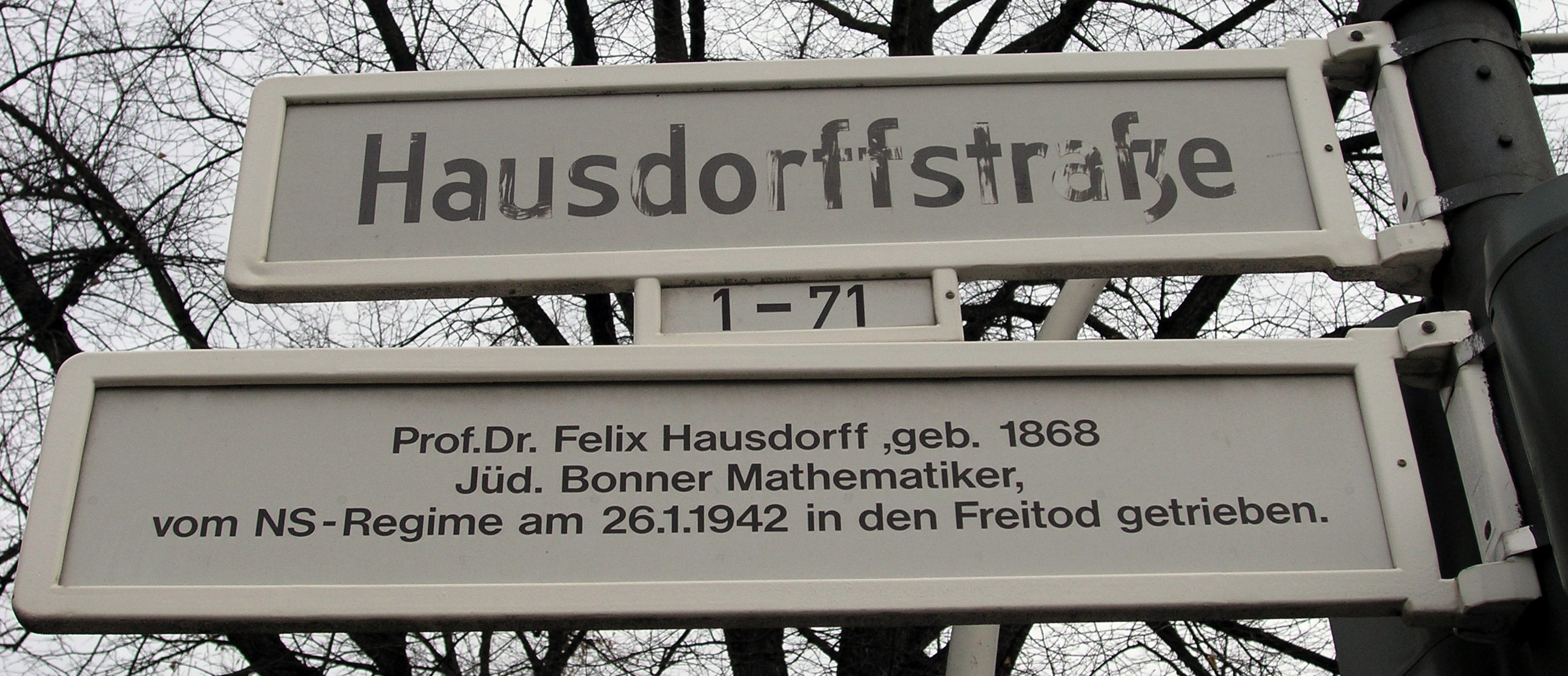
Hausdorffstraße (Bonn)

Hausdorff's library was sold by his son-in-law and sole heir, Arthur König. The portions of Hausdorff's Nachlass which could be saved by Hans Bonnet are now in the university and State Library of Bonn. The Nachlass is catalogued.

== Work and reception ==
=== Hausdorff as philosopher and writer (Paul Mongré) ===
Hausdorff's volume of aphorisms, published in 1897, was his first work published under the pseudonym Paul Mongré. It is entitled Sant' Ilario: Thoughts from the landscape of Zarathustra. The subtitle plays first on the fact that Hausdorff had completed his book during a recovery stay on the Ligurian coast by Genoa and that in this same area, Friedrich Nietzsche wrote the first two parts of Thus Spoke Zarathustra; he also alludes to his spiritual closeness to Nietzsche. In an article on Sant' Ilario in the weekly paper Die Zukunft, Hausdorff acknowledged in expressis verbis his debt to Nietzsche.

Hausdorff was not trying to copy or even exceed Nietzsche. "Of Nietzsche imitation no trace", says a contemporary review. He follows Nietzsche in an attempt to liberate individual thinking, to take the liberty of questioning outdated standards. Hausdorff maintained critical distance to the late works of Nietzsche. In his essay on the book The Will to Power compiled from notes left in the Nietzsche Archive he says:

In Nietzsche glows a fanatic. His morality of breeding, erected on our present biological and physiological foundations of knowledge: that could be a world historical scandal against which the Inquisition and witch trials fade into harmless aberrations.

His critical standard he took from Nietzsche himself,

From the kind, modest, understanding Nietzsche and from the free spirit of the cool, dogma-free, unsystematic skeptic Nietzsche ...

In 1898—also under the pseudonym Paul Mongré—Hausdorff published an epistemological experiment titled Chaos in cosmic selection. The critique of metaphysics put forward in this book had its starting point in Hausdorff's confrontation with Nietzsche's idea of eternal recurrence. Ultimately, it is about destroying any kind of metaphysics. Of the world itself, of the transcendent core of the world—as Hausdorff puts it—we know nothing and we can know nothing. We must assume "the world itself" as undetermined and undeterminable, as mere chaos. The world of our experience, our cosmos, is the result of the selections that we have made and will always instinctively make according to our capacity for understanding. Seen from that chaos, all other frameworks, other cosmos, are conceivable. That is to say, from the world of our cosmos, one cannot draw any conclusions about the transcendent world.

In 1904, in the magazine The New Rundschau, Hausdorff's play appeared, the one-act play The doctor of his honor. It is a crude satire on the duel and on the traditional concepts of honor and nobility of the Prussian officer corps, which in the developing bourgeois society were increasingly anachronistic. The doctor of his honor was Hausdorff's most popular literary work. In 1914–1918 there were numerous performances in more than thirty cities. Hausdorff later wrote an epilogue to the play, but it was not performed at that time. Only in 2006 did this epilogue have its premier at the annual meeting of the German Mathematical Society in Bonn. In 2021 the first English translation of The doctor of his honor was published by The Hausdorff Center for Mathematics in Bonn.

Besides the works mentioned above, Hausdorff also wrote numerous essays that appeared in some of the leading literary magazines of the time. He also wrote a book of poems, Ecstasy (1900). Some of his poems were set to music by Austrian composer Joseph Marx.

=== Theory of ordered sets ===
Hausdorff's entrance into a thorough study of ordered sets was prompted in part by Cantor's continuum problem: where should the cardinal number $\aleph = 2^{\aleph_0}$ be placed in the sequence $\{\aleph_{\alpha}\}$? In a letter to Hilbert on 29 September 1904, he speaks of this problem, "it has plagued me almost like monomania". Hausdorff saw a new strategy to attack the problem in the set $\mathrm{card} (T(\aleph_0)) = \aleph$. Cantor had suspected $\aleph = \aleph_1$, but had only been able to show that $\aleph \geq \aleph_1$. While $\aleph_1$ is the "number" of possible well-orderings of a countable set, $\aleph$ had now emerged as the "number" of all possible orders of such an amount. It was natural, therefore, to study systems that are more specific than orders, but more general than well-orderings. Hausdorff did just that in his first volume of 1901, with the publication of theoretical studies of "graded sets". However, we know from the results of Kurt Gödel and Paul Cohen that this strategy to solve the continuum problem is just as ineffectual as Cantor's strategy, which was aimed at generalizing the Cantor–Bendixson principle from closed sets to general uncountable sets.

In 1904 Hausdorff published the recursion named after him, which states that for each non-limit ordinal $\mu$ we have $\aleph_{\mu}^{\aleph_{\alpha}} = \aleph_{\mu} \; \aleph_{\mu -1}^{\aleph_{\alpha}}.$

This formula was, together with a later notion called cofinality introduced by Hausdorff, the basis for all further results for Aleph exponentiation. Hausdorff's excellent knowledge of recurrence formulas of this kind also empowered him to uncover an error in Julius König's lecture at the International Congress of Mathematicians in 1904 in Heidelberg. There König had argued that the continuum cannot be well-ordered, so its cardinality is not an Aleph at all, and thus caused a great stir. The fact that it was Hausdorff who clarified the mistake carries a special significance, since a false impression of the events in Heidelberg lasted for over 50 years.

In the years 1906–1909 Hausdorff did his groundbreaking and fundamental work on ordered sets. Of fundamental importance to the whole theory is the concept of cofinality, which Hausdorff introduced. If $\alpha$ is an ordinal, then a collection $\mathcal{A}$ of ordinals each less than $\alpha$ is cofinal in $\alpha$ if, for every $\beta<\alpha$, there is a $\gamma\in\mathcal{A}$ such that $\beta\leq\gamma$. So, in a sense, a cofinal collection in $\alpha$ encompasses all of $\alpha$. Since a collection of objects from a well-ordered set is well-ordered under the original ordering, we can naturally assign a well-order to any such $\mathcal{A}$. As it turns out, any collection $\mathcal{A}$ of ordinals less than an ordinal $\alpha$ has an order type no greater than $\alpha$. An ordinal $\alpha$ is then called regular if any collection of ordinals cofinal in $\alpha$ has, in fact, the same order type as $\alpha$. In other words, $\alpha$ is regular if every collection of smaller ordinals that encompasses $\alpha$ has the same size, order-theoretically, as $\alpha$. Hausdorff's question, whether there are regular numbers which index a limit ordinal, was the starting point for the theory of inaccessible cardinals. Hausdorff had already noticed that such numbers, if they exist, must be of "exorbitant size".

The following theorem due to Hausdorff is also of fundamental importance: for each unbounded and ordered dense set $A$ there are two uniquely determined regular initial numbers $\omega_{\xi}, \omega_{\eta}$ so that $A$ is cofinal with $\omega_{\xi}$ and coinitial with $\omega_{\eta}^*$ (where * denotes the inverse order). This theorem provides, for example, a technique to characterize elements and gaps in ordered sets.

If $W$ is a predetermined set of characters (element and gap characters), the question arises whether there are ordered sets whose character set is exactly $W$. One can easily find a necessary condition for $W$, but Hausdorff was also able to show that this condition is sufficient. For this one needs a rich reservoir of ordered sets, which Hausdorff was also able to create with his theory of general products and powers. In this reservoir can be found interesting structures like the Hausdorff $\eta_{\alpha}$ normal-types, in connection with which Hausdorff first formulated the generalized continuum hypothesis. Hausdorff's $\eta_{\alpha}$-sets formed the starting point for the study of the important model theory of saturated structure.

Hausdorff's general products and powers of cardinalities led him to study the concept of partially ordered set. The question of whether any ordered subset of a partially ordered set is contained in a maximal ordered subset was answered in the positive by Hausdorff using the well-ordering theorem. This is the Hausdorff maximal principle, which follows from either the well-ordering theorem or the axiom of choice, and as it turned out, is also equivalent to the axiom of choice.

Writing in 1908, Arthur Moritz Schoenflies found in his report on set theory that the newer theory of ordered sets (i.e., that which occurred after Cantor's extensions) was almost exclusively due to Hausdorff.

=== The "Magnum Opus": "Principles of set theory" ===
According to previous notions, set theory included not only the general set theory and the theory of sets of points, but also dimension and measure theory. Hausdorff's textbook was the first to present all of set theory in this broad sense, systematically and with full proofs. Hausdorff was aware of how easily the human mind can err while also seeking for rigor and truth, so in the preface of his work he promises:

… to be as economical as possible with the human privilege of error.

This book went far beyond its masterful portrayal of already-known concepts. It also contained a series of important original contributions by the author.

The first few chapters deal with the basic concepts of general set theory. In the beginning Hausdorff provides a detailed set algebra with some pioneering new concepts (differences chain, set rings and set fields, $\delta$- and $\sigma$-systems). The introductory paragraphs on sets and their connections included, for example, the modern set-theoretic notion of functions. Chapters 3 to 5 discussed the classical theory of cardinal numbers, order types and ordinals, and in the sixth chapter "Relations between ordered and well-ordered sets" Hausdorff presents, among other things, the most important results of his own research on ordered sets.

In the chapters on "point sets"—the topological chapters—Hausdorff developed for the first time, based on the known neighborhood axioms, a systematic theory of topological spaces, where in addition he added the separation axiom later named after him. This theory emerges from a comprehensive synthesis of earlier approaches of other mathematicians and Hausdorff's own reflections on the problem of space. The concepts and theorems of classical point set theory $\mathbb{R}^n$ are—as far as possible—transferred to the general case, and thus become part of the newly created general or set-theoretic topology. But Hausdorff not only performed this "translation work", but he also developed basic construction methods of topology such as core formation (open core, self-dense core) and shell formation (closure), and he works through the fundamental importance of the concept of an open set (called "area" by him) and of the concept of compactness introduced by Fréchet. He also founded and developed the theory of the connected set, particularly through the introduction of the terms "component" and "quasi-component".

With the first Hausdorff countability axiom, and eventually the second, the considered spaces were gradually further specialized. A large class of spaces satisfying the countable first axiom are metric spaces. They were introduced in 1906 by Fréchet under the name "classes (E)". The term "metric space" comes from Hausdorff. In Principles, he developed the theory of metric spaces and systematically enriched it through a series of new concepts: Hausdorff metric, complete, total boundedness, $\rho$-connectivity, reducible sets. Fréchet's work is not particularly famous; only through Hausdorff's Principles did metric spaces become common knowledge to mathematicians.

The chapter on illustrations and the final chapter of Principles on measure and integration theory are enriched by the generality of the material and the originality of presentation. Hausdorff's mention of the importance of measure theory for probability had great historical effect, despite its laconic brevity. One finds in this chapter the first correct proof of the strong law of large numbers of Émile Borel. Finally, the appendix contains the single most spectacular result of the whole book, namely Hausdorff's theorem that one cannot define a volume for all bounded subsets of $\mathbb{R}^n$ for $n \geq 3$. The proof is based on Hausdorff's paradoxical ball decomposition, whose production requires the axiom of choice.

During the 20th century, it became the standard to build mathematical theories on axiomatic set theory. The creation of axiomatically founded generalized theories, such as general topology, served among other things to single out the common structural core for various specific cases or regions and then set up an abstract theory, which contained all these parts as special cases. This brought a great success in the form of simplification and harmonization, and ultimately brought with itself an economy of thought. Hausdorff himself highlighted this aspect in the Principles. In the topological chapter, the basic concepts are methodologically a pioneering effort, and they paved the way for the development of modern mathematics.

Principles of set theory appeared in April 1914, on the eve of the First World War, which dramatically affected scientific life in Europe. Under these circumstances, the effects Hausdorff's book on mathematical thought would not be seen for five to six years after its appearance. After the war, a new generation of young researchers set forth to expand on the abundant suggestions that were included in this work. Undoubtedly, topology was the primary focus of attention. The journal Fundamenta Mathematicae, founded in Poland in 1920, played a special role in the reception of Hausdorff's ideas. It was one of the first mathematical journals with special emphasis on set theory, topology, the theory of real functions, measure and integration theory, functional analysis, logic, and foundations of mathematics. Across this spectrum, a special focus was placed on topology. Hausdorff's Principles was cited in the very first volume of Fundamenta Mathematicae, and through citation counting its influence continued at a remarkable rate. Of the 558 works (Hausdorff's own three works not included), which appeared in the first twenty volumes of Fundamenta Mathematicae from 1920 to 1933, 88 of them cite Principles. One must also take into account the fact that, as Hausdorff's ideas became increasingly commonplace, so too were they used in a number of works that did not cite them explicitly.

The Russian topological school, founded by Paul Alexandroff and Paul Urysohn, was based heavily on Hausdorff's Principles. This is shown by the surviving correspondence in Hausdorff's Nachlass with Urysohn, and especially Alexandroff and Urysohn's Mémoire sur les multiplicités Cantoriennes, a work the size of a book, in which Urysohn developed dimension theory and Principles is cited no fewer than 60 times.

After the Second World War there was a strong demand for Hausdorff's book, and there were three reprints at Chelsea from 1949, 1965 and 1978.

=== Descriptive set theory, measure theory and analysis ===
In 1916, Alexandroff and Hausdorff independently solved the continuum problem for Borel sets: Every Borel set in a complete separable metric space is either countable or has the cardinality of the continuum. This result generalizes the Cantor–Bendixson theorem that such a statement holds for the closed sets of $\mathbb{R}^n$. For linear $G_{\delta}$ sets William Henry Young had proved the result in 1903, for $G_{\delta\sigma\delta}$ sets Hausdorff obtained a corresponding result in 1914 in Principles. The theorem of Alexandroff and Hausdorff was a strong impetus for further development of descriptive set theory.

Among the publications of Hausdorff in his time at Greifswald the work Dimension and outer measure from 1919 is particularly outstanding. In this work, the concepts were introduced which are now known as Hausdorff measure and the Hausdorff dimension. It has remained highly topical and in later years has been one of the most cited mathematical works from the decade of 1910 to 1920.

The concept of Hausdorff dimension is useful for the characterization and comparison of "highly rugged quantities". The concepts of Dimension and outer measure have experienced applications and further developments in many areas such as in the theory of dynamical systems, geometric measure theory, the theory of self-similar sets and fractals, the theory of stochastic processes, harmonic analysis, potential theory, and number theory.

Significant analytical work of Hausdorff occurred in his second time at Bonn. In Summation methods and moment sequences I in 1921, he developed a whole class of summation methods for divergent series, which today are called Hausdorff methods. In Hardy's classic Divergent Series, an entire chapter is devoted to the Hausdorff method. The classical methods of Hölder and Cesàro proved to be special cases of the Hausdorff method. Every Hausdorff method is given by a moment sequence; in this context Hausdorff gave an elegant solution of the moment problem for a finite interval, bypassing the theory of continued fractions. In his paper Moment problems for a finite interval of 1923 he treated more special moment problems, such as those with certain restrictions for generating density $\varphi(x)$, for instance $\varphi(x) \in L^p[0,1]$. Criteria for solvability and decidability of moment problems occupied Hausdorff for many years, as hundreds of pages of handwritten notes in his Nachlass attest.

A significant contribution to the emerging field of functional analysis in the 1920s was Hausdorff's extension of the Riesz-Fischer theorem to $L^p$ spaces in his 1923 work An extension of Parseval's theorem on Fourier series. He proved the inequalities now named after him and W.H. Young. The Hausdorff–Young inequalities became the starting point of major new developments.

Hausdorff's book Set Theory appeared in 1927. This was declared as a second Edition of Principles, but it was actually a completely new book. Since the scale was significantly reduced due to its appearance in Goschen's teaching library, large parts of the theory of ordered sets and measures and integration theory were removed. In its preface, Hausdorff writes, "Perhaps even more than these deletions the reader will regret the most that, to further save space in point set theory, I have abandoned the topological point of view through which the first edition has apparently acquired many friends, and focused on the simpler theory of metric spaces".

In fact, this was an explicit regret of some reviewers of the work. As a kind of compensation Hausdorff showed for the first time the then-current state of descriptive set theory. This fact assured the book almost as intense a reception as Principles, especially in Fundamenta Mathematicae. As a textbook it was very popular. In 1935 there was an expanded edition published, and this was reprinted by Dover in 1944. An English translation appeared in 1957 with reprints in 1962 and 1967.

There was also a Russian edition (1937), although it was only partially a faithful translation, and partly a reworking by Alexandroff and Kolmogorov. In this translation the topological point of view again moved to the forefront. In 1928 a review of Set Theory was written by Hans Hahn, who perhaps had the danger of German antisemitism in his mind as he closed his discussion with the following sentence:

An exemplary depiction in every respect of a difficult and thorny area, a work on par with those which have carried the fame of German science throughout the world, and such that all German mathematicians may be proud of.

=== His last works ===
In 1938, Hausdorff's last work Extension of a continuous map showed that a continuous function from a closed subset $F$ of a metric space $E$ can be extended to all of $E$ (although the image may need to be extended). As a special case, every homeomorphism from $F$ can be extended to a homeomorphism from $E$. This work continued research from earlier years. In 1919, in About semi-continuous functions and their generalization, Hausdorff had, among other things, given another proof of the Tietze extension theorem. In 1930, in Extending a homeomorphism, he showed the following: Let $E$ be a metric space, $F \subseteq E$ a closed subset. If $F$ is given a new metric without changing the topology, this metric can be extended to the entire space without changing the topology. The work Graded spaces appeared in 1935, where Hausdorff discussed spaces which fulfilled the Kuratowski closure axioms up to the axiom of idempotence. These spaces are often also called closure spaces, and Hausdorff used them to study relationships between the Fréchet limit spaces and topological spaces.

== Hausdorff as name-giver ==
The name Hausdorff is found throughout mathematics. Among others, these concepts were named after him:

- Hausdorff completion
- Hausdorff convergence
- Hausdorff density
- Hausdorff dimension
- Hausdorff distance
- Hausdorff gap
- Hausdorff maximal principle
- Hausdorff measure
- Hausdorff metric
- Hausdorff moment problem
- Hausdorff paradox
- Hausdorff space
- Hausdorff–Young inequality
- Baker–Campbell–Hausdorff formula

In the universities of Bonn and Greifswald, these things were named in his honor:

- the Hausdorff Center for Mathematics in Bonn,
- the Hausdorff Research Institute for Mathematics in Bonn, and
- the Felix Hausdorff Internationale Begegnungszentrum in Greifswald.

Besides these, in Bonn there is the Hausdorffstraße (Hausdorff Street), where he first lived. (Haus-Nr. 61). In Greifswald there is a Felix-Hausdorff–Straße, where the Institutes for Biochemistry and Physics are located, among others. Since 2011, there is a "Hausdorffweg" (Hausdorff-Way) in the middle of Leipziger Ortsteil Gohlis.

The Asteroid 24947 Hausdorff was named after him.

== Writings ==
=== As Paul Mongré ===
Only a selection of the essays that appeared in text are shown here.

- Sant'Ilario. Gedanken aus der Landschaft Zarathustras. Verlag C. G. Naumann, Leipzig 1897.
- Das Chaos in kosmischer Auslese — Ein erkenntniskritischer Versuch. Verlag C. G. Naumann, Leipzig 1898; Reprinted with foreword by Max Bense: Baden-Baden: Agis-Verlag 1976, ISBN 3-87007-013-7
- Massenglück und Einzelglück. Neue Deutsche Rundschau (Freie Bühne) 9 (1), (1898), S. 64–75.
- Das unreinliche Jahrhundert. Neue Deutsche Rundschau (Freie Bühne) 9 (5), (1898), S. 443–452.
- Ekstasen. Volume of poetry. Verlag H. Seemann Nachf., Leipzig 1900.
- Der Wille zur Macht. In: Neue Deutsche Rundschau (Freie Bühne) 13 (12) (1902), S. 1334–1338.
- Max Klingers Beethoven. Zeitschrift für bildende Kunst, Neue Folge 13 (1902), S. 183–189.
- Sprachkritik Neue Deutsche Rundschau (Freie Bühne) 14 (12), (1903), S. 1233–1258.
- Der Arzt seiner Ehre, Groteske. In: Die neue Rundschau (Freie Bühne) 15 (8), (1904), S. 989-1013. New edition as: Der Arzt seiner Ehre. Komödie in einem Akt mit einem Epilog. With 7 portraits and woodcuts by Hans Alexander Müller after drawings by Walter Tiemann, 10 Bl., 71 S. Fifth printing by Leipziger Bibliophilen-Abends, Leipzig 1910. New edition: S. Fischer, Berlin 1912, 88 S. The Doctor of his Honor (English Translation of Der Arzt seiner Ehre, Groteske) by Volker Vetter and William P. Hausdorff, Hausdorff Center for Mathematics, Bonn 2021.

=== As Felix Hausdorff ===
- Beiträge zur Wahrscheinlichkeitsrechnung. Proceedings of the Royal Saxon Society for the Sciences at Leipzig. Math.-phys. Classe 53 (1901), S. 152–178.
- Über eine gewisse Art geordneter Mengen. Proceedings of the Royal Saxon Society for the Sciences at Leipzig. Math.-phys. Classe 53 (1901), S. 460–475.
- Das Raumproblem (Inaugural lecture at the University of Leipzig on 4. July 1903). Ostwald's Annals of Natural Philosophy 3 (1903), S. 1–23.
- Der Potenzbegriff in der Mengenlehre. Annual report of the DMV 13 (1904), S. 569–571.
- Untersuchungen über Ordnungstypen I, II, III. Proceedings of the Royal Saxon Society for the Sciences at Leipzig. Math.-phys.\ Klasse 58 (1906), S. 106–169.
- Untersuchungen über Ordnungstypen IV, V. Proceedings of the Royal Saxon Society for the Sciences at Leipzig. Math.-phys. Klasse 59 (1907), S. 84–159.
- Über dichte Ordnungstypen. Annual report of the DMV 16 (1907), S. 541–546.
- Grundzüge einer Theorie der geordneten Mengen. Math. Annalen 65 (1908), S. 435–505.
- Die Graduierung nach dem Endverlauf. Proceedings of the Royal Saxon Society for the Sciences at Leipzig. Math.-phys. Klasse 31 (1909), S. 295–334.
- Grundzüge der Mengenlehre. Verlag Veit & Co, Leipzig. 476 S. mit 53 Figuren. Further printings: Chelsea Pub. Co. 1949, 1965, 1978.
- Die Mächtigkeit der Borelschen Mengen. Math. Annalen 77 (1916), S. 430–437.
- Dimension und äußeres Maß. Math. Annalen 79 (1919), S. 157–179.
- Über halbstetige Funktionen und deren Verallgemeinerung. Math. Zeitschrift 5 (1919), S. 292–309.
- Summationsmethoden und Momentfolgen I, II. Math. Zeitschrift 9 (1921), I: S. 74-109, II: S. 280–299.
- Eine Ausdehnung des Parsevalschen Satzes über Fourierreihen. Math. Zeitschrift 16 (1923), S. 163–169.
- Momentprobleme für ein endliches Intervall. Math. Zeitschrift 16 (1923), S. 220–248.
- Mengenlehre, second reworked edition. Verlag Walter de Gruyter & Co., Berlin. 285 S. with 12 figures.
- Erweiterung einer Homöomorphie (PDF; 389 kB) Fundamenta Mathematicae 16 (1930), S. 353–360.
- Mengenlehre, third edition. With an additional chapter and several appendices. Verlag Walter de Gruyter & Co., Berlin. 307 S. mit 12 Figuren. Nachdruck: Dover Pub. New York, 1944. Englisch edition: Set theory. Translated from the German by J. R. Aumann et al. Chelsea Pub. Co., New York 1957, 1962, 1967.
- Gestufte Räume. (PDF; 1,2 MB) Fundamenta Mathematicae 25 (1935), S. 486–502.
- Erweiterung einer stetigen Abbildung (PDF; 450 kB) Fundamenta Mathematicae 30 (1938), S. 40–47.
- Nachgelassene Schriften. 2 volumes. Ed.: G. Bergmann, Teubner, Stuttgart 1969. From the Nachlass, Volume I includes fascicles 510–543, 545–559, 561–577, Volume II fascicles 578–584, 598–658 (all fascicles given in facsimile).

Hausdorff on Ordered Sets. Trans. and Ed.: Jacob M. Plotkin, American Mathematical Society 2005.

== Collected works ==
The "Hausdorff-Edition", edited by E. Brieskorn (†), F. Hirzebruch (†), W. Purkert (all Bonn), R. Remmert (†) (Münster) and E. Scholz (Wuppertal) with the collaboration of over twenty mathematicians, historians, philosophers and scholars, is an ongoing project of the North Rhine-Westphalian Academy of Sciences, Humanities and the Arts to present the works of Hausdorff, with commentary and much additional material. The volumes have been published by Springer-Verlag, Heidelberg. Nine volumes have been published with volume I being split up into volume IA and volume IB. See the website of the Hausdorff Project website of the Hausdorff Edition (German) for further information. The volumes are:

- Band IA: Allgemeine Mengenlehre. 2013, ISBN 978-3-642-25598-4.
- Band IB: Felix Hausdorff – Paul Mongré (Biographie). 2018, ISBN 978-3-662-56380-9.
- Band II: Grundzüge der Mengenlehre (1914). 2002, ISBN 978-3-540-42224-2
- Band III: Mengenlehre (1927, 1935); Deskriptive Mengenlehre und Topologie. 2008, ISBN 978-3-540-76806-7
- Band IV: Analysis, Algebra und Zahlentheorie. 2001, ISBN 978-3-540-41760-6
- Band V: Astronomie, Optik und Wahrscheinlichkeitstheorie. 2006, ISBN 978-3-540-30624-5
- Band VI: Geometrie, Raum und Zeit. 2020. ISBN 978-3-540-77838-7
- Band VII: Philosophisches Werk. 2004, ISBN 978-3-540-20836-5
- Band VIII: Literarisches Werk. 2010, ISBN 978-3-540-77758-8
- Band IX: Korrespondenz. 2012, ISBN 978-3-642-01116-0.

== See also ==
- List of things named after Felix Hausdorff
- Gromov–Hausdorff convergence
- Hausdorff distance
- Hausdorff gap
- Maurice René Fréchet
- Hausdorff Medal
