= Zdeněk Frolík =

Czech mathematician (1933–1989)

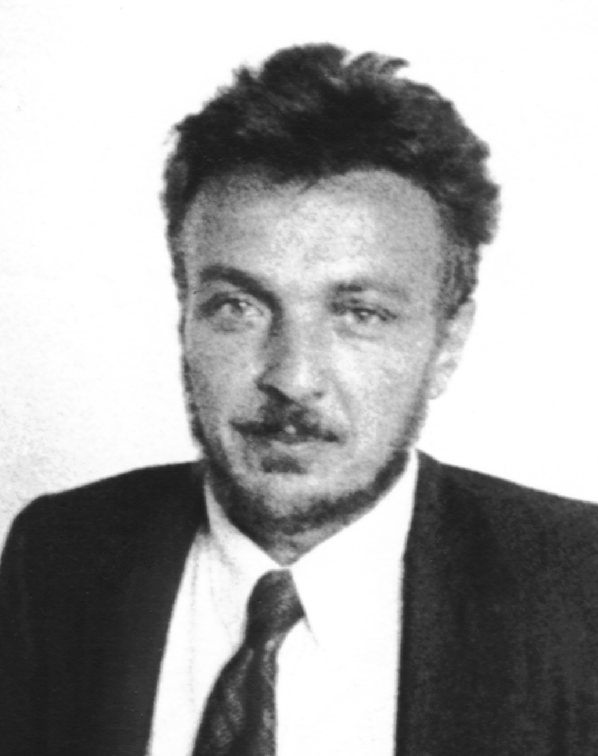
Zdeněk Frolík in 1971

Zdeněk Frolík (10 March 1933 – 3 May 1989) was a Czech mathematician. His research interests included topology and functional analysis. In particular, his work concerned covering properties of topological spaces, ultrafilters, homogeneity, measures, uniform spaces. He was one of the founders of modern descriptive theory of sets and spaces.

Two classes of topological spaces are given Frolík's name: the class P of all spaces $X$ such that $X \times Y$ is pseudocompact for every pseudocompact space $Y$, and the class C of all spaces $X$ such that $X \times Y$ is countably compact for every countably compact space $Y$.

Frolík prepared his Ph.D. thesis under the supervision of Miroslav Katetov and Eduard Čech.

== Selected publications ==
- Generalizations of compact and Lindelöf spaces - Czechoslovak Math. J., 9 (1959), pp. 172–217 (in Russian, English summary)
- The topological product of countably compact spaces - Czechoslovak Math. J., 10 (1960), pp. 329–338
- The topological product of two pseudocompact spaces - Czechoslovak Math. J., 10 (1960), pp. 339–349
- Generalizations of the Gδ-property of complete metric spaces - Czechoslovak Math. J., 10 (1960), pp. 359–379
- On the topological product of paracompact spaces - Bull. Acad. Polon., 8 (1960), pp. 747–750
- Locally complete topological spaces - Dokl. Akad. Nauk SSSR, 137 (1961), pp. 790–792 (in Russian)
- Applications of complete families of continuous functions to the theory of Q-spaces - Czechoslovak Math. J., 11 (1961), pp. 115–133
- Invariance of Gδ-spaces under mappings - Czechoslovak Math. J., 11 (1961), pp. 258–260
- On almost real compact spaces - Bull. Acad. Polon., 9 (1961), pp. 247–250
- On two problems of W.W. Comfort - Comment. Math. Univ. Carolin., 7 (1966), pp. 139–144
- Non-homogeneity of βP- P - Comment. Math. Univ. Carolin., 7 (1966), pp. 705–710
- Sums of ultrafilters - Bull. Amer. Math. Soc., 73 (1967), pp. 87–91
- Homogeneity problems for extremally disconnected spaces - Comment. Math. Univ. Carolin., 8 (1967), pp. 757–763
- Baire sets that are Borelian subspaces - Proc. Roy. Soc. A, 299 (1967), pp. 287–290
- On the Suslin-graph theorem - Comment Math. Univ. Carolin., 9 (1968), pp. 243–249
- A survey of separable descriptive theory of sets and spaces - Czechoslovak Math. J., 20 (1970), pp. 406–467
- A measurable map with analytic domain and metrizable range is quotient - Bull. Amer. Math. Soc., 76 (1970), pp. 1112–1117
- Luzin sets are additive - Comment Math. Univ. Carolin., 21 (1980), pp. 527–534
- Refinements of perfect maps onto metrizable spaces and an application to Čech-analytic spaces - Topology Appl., 33 (1989), pp. 77–84
- Decomposability of completely Suslin additive families - Proc. Amer. Math. Soc., 82 (1981), pp. 359–365
- Applications of Luzinian separation principles (non-separable case) - Fund. Math., 117 (1983), pp. 165–185
- Analytic and Luzin spaces (non-separable case) - Topology Appl., 19 (1985), pp. 129–156

== See also ==
- Wijsman convergence
