= William Beckner (mathematician) =

American mathematician (born 1941)

- Born: September 15, 1941 (age 84); Kirksville, Missouri, US
- Education: Princeton University; University of Missouri (Columbia)
- Known for: Sharp Inequalities; Babenko–Beckner inequality
- Awards: Salem Prize (1975)
- Scientific career
- Fields: Mathematics
- Workplaces: University of Texas, Austin; Princeton University; University of Chicago
- Doctoral advisor: Elias Stein
- Doctoral students: Emanuel Carneiro

William Beckner (born September 15, 1941) is an American mathematician, known for his work in harmonic analysis, especially geometric inequalities. He is the Paul V. Montgomery Centennial Memorial Professor in Mathematics at The University of Texas at Austin.

== Education ==
Beckner earned his Bachelor of Science in physics from the University of Missouri in Columbia, Missouri in 1963, where he became a member of Phi Beta Kappa society. He later earned his Ph.D. in mathematics at Princeton University in Princeton, New Jersey, where his doctoral adviser was Elias Stein. He also completed some postgraduate work in mathematics under adviser A.P. Calderon at the University of Chicago.

== Awards and honors ==
- Salem Prize
- Sloan Fellow
- Fellow of the American Mathematical Society
- International Congress of Mathematicians Invited Lecture, Helsinki, 1978

== Selected publications ==
- Beckner, William (1975). "Inequalities in Fourier Analysis". Annals of Mathematics. 102 (1): 159–182. doi:10.2307/1970980. JSTOR 1970980.
- Beckner, William (1993). "Sharp Sobolev inequalities on the sphere and the Moser–Trudinger inequality". Annals of Mathematics. 138 (1): 213–242. doi:10.2307/2946638. JSTOR 2946638.
- Beckner, William (1995). "Geometric inequalities in Fourier analysis". Essays on Fourier Analysis in Honor of Elias M. Stein. Princeton University Press. pp. 36–68. ISBN 9780691603650. JSTOR j.ctt7ztk2g.5.

== See also ==
- Babenko–Beckner inequality
- Hirschman uncertainty
