= Erich Bessel-Hagen =

German mathematician and historian of mathematics

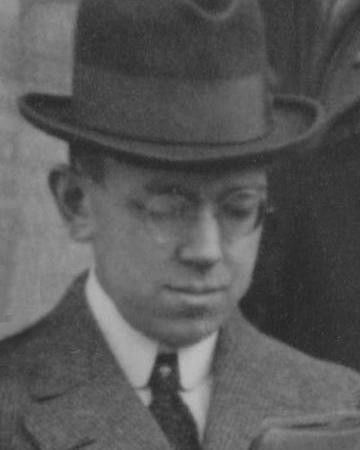
Erich Bessel-Hagen

Erich Bessel-Hagen (12 September 1898 in Charlottenburg – 29 March 1946 in Bonn) was a German mathematician and a historian of mathematics.

Erich Paul Werner Bessel-Hagen was born in 1898 in Charlottenburg, a suburb, later a district in Berlin. He studied at the University of Berlin where in 1920 he obtained a Ph.D. in mathematics under the direction of Constantin Carathéodory.

His reputation was that of a gentleman as well as a conscientious intellect. This was averred in the early 1940s, when the ruling Nazis increased their persecutions of German officials who have Jewish ancestry. After Felix Hausdorff (a professor 30 years his senior) had been retired and placed under restrictions, Bessel-Hagen became the only former colleague who visited him regularly. On noticing that Hausdorff used private math researches to while away time, he started bringing him books he had borrowed from a library which no longer welcomed Jews.

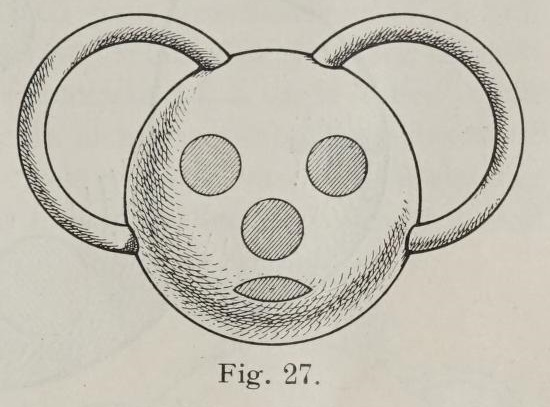
Kerékjártó's portrait of Bessel-Hagen as a topological space.

Bessel-Hagen was occasionally the victim of practical jokes at Göttingen, where he studied for seven years. In the first volume of Béla Kerékjártó's topology textbook Vorlesungen über Topologie (1923) the index points the reader trying to find "Bessel-Hagen" to page 151. There is no reference to Bessel-Hagen on this page, but there is a picture of a face-like topological space, intended as a jocular portrait of the big-eared mathematician.
