= Γ-convergence =

Type of convergence for functionals

In the field of mathematical analysis for the calculus of variations, Γ-convergence (Gamma-convergence) is a notion of convergence for functionals. It was introduced by Ennio De Giorgi.

== Definition ==
Let $X$ be a topological space and $\mathcal{N}(x)$ denote the set of all neighbourhoods of the point $x\in X$. Let further $F_n:X\to\overline{\mathbb{R}}$ be a sequence of functionals on $X$. The Γ-lower limit and the Γ-upper limit are defined as follows:

$$\Gamma\text{-}\liminf_{n\to\infty} F_n(x)=\sup_{N_x\in\mathcal{N}(x)}\liminf_{n\to\infty}\inf_{y\in N_x}F_n(y),$$

$$\Gamma\text{-}\limsup_{n\to\infty} F_n(x)=\sup_{N_x\in\mathcal{N}(x)}\limsup_{n\to\infty}\inf_{y\in N_x}F_n(y)$$.

$F_n$ are said to $\Gamma$-converge to a functional $F$, if $\Gamma\text{-}\liminf_{n\to\infty} F_n=\Gamma\text{-}\limsup_{n\to\infty} F_n=F$.

== Definition in first-countable spaces ==
In first-countable spaces, the above definition can be characterized in terms of sequential $\Gamma$-convergence in the following way. Let $X$ be a first-countable space and $F_n:X\to\overline{\mathbb{R}}$ a sequence of functionals on $X$. Then $F_n$ are said to $\Gamma$-converge to the $\Gamma$-limit $F:X\to\overline{\mathbb{R}}$ if the following two conditions hold:

- Lower bound inequality: For every sequence $x_n\in X$ such that $x_n\to x$ as $n\to+\infty$,

$$F(x)\le\liminf_{n\to\infty} F_n(x_n).$$

- Upper bound inequality: For every $x\in X$, there is a sequence $x_n$ converging to $x$ such that

$$F(x)\ge\limsup_{n\to\infty} F_n(x_n)$$

The first condition means that $F$ provides an asymptotic common lower bound for the $F_n$. The second condition means that this lower bound is optimal.

== Relation to Kuratowski convergence ==
$\Gamma$-convergence is connected to the notion of Kuratowski-convergence of sets. Let $\text{epi} (F)$ denote the epigraph of a function $F$ and let $F_n:X\to\overline{\mathbb{R}}$ be a sequence of functionals on $X$. Then

$$\text{epi} ( \Gamma\text{-}\liminf_{n\to\infty} F_n ) = \text{K}\text{-}\limsup_{n\to\infty} \text{epi}(F_n),$$
$$\text{epi} ( \Gamma\text{-}\limsup_{n\to\infty} F_n ) = \text{K}\text{-}\liminf_{n\to\infty} \text{epi}(F_n),$$

where $\text{K-}\liminf$ denotes the Kuratowski limes inferior and $\text{K-}\limsup$ the Kuratowski limes superior in the product topology of $X\times \mathbb{R}$. In particular, $(F_n)_n$ $\Gamma$-converges to $F$ in $X$ if and only if $(\text{epi}(F_n))_n$ $\text{K}$-converges to $\text{epi}(F)$ in $X\times\mathbb R$. This is the reason why $\Gamma$-convergence is sometimes called epi-convergence.

== Properties ==
- Minimizers converge to minimizers: If $F_n$ $\Gamma$-converge to $F$, and $x_n$ is a minimizer for $F_n$, then every cluster point of the sequence $x_n$ is a minimizer of $F$.
- $\Gamma$-limits are always lower semicontinuous.
- $\Gamma$-convergence is stable under continuous perturbations: If $F_n$ $\Gamma$-converges to $F$ and $G:X\to[0,+\infty)$ is continuous, then $F_n+G$ will $\Gamma$-converge to $F+G$.
- A constant sequence of functionals $F_n=F$ does not necessarily $\Gamma$-converge to $F$, but to the relaxation of $F$, the largest lower semicontinuous functional below $F$.

== Applications ==
An important use for $\Gamma$-convergence is in homogenization theory. It can also be used to rigorously justify the passage from discrete to continuum theories for materials, for example, in elasticity theory.

== See also ==
- Mosco convergence
- Kuratowski convergence
- Epi-convergence
