= Claude Chabauty =

French mathematician (1910–1990)

Chabauty in the 1929 ENS yearbook

Claude Chabauty (May 4, 1910, in Oran – June 2, 1990, in Dieulefit) was a French mathematician.

== Career ==
He was admitted in 1929 to the École normale supérieure in Paris. In 1938 he obtained his doctorate with a thesis on number theory and algebraic geometry. Subsequently he was a professor in Strasbourg. From 1954 on, and for 22 years, he was the director of the department of pure mathematics at the University of Grenoble.

== Mathematical work ==
He worked on Diophantine approximation and geometry of numbers, where he used both classical and p-adic analytic methods. He introduced the Chabauty topology to generalise Mahler's compactness theorem from Euclidean lattices to more general discrete subgroups.

His 1938 doctoral thesis, developing ideas of Skolem, is important in algebraic geometry. According to André Weil:

In his beautiful thesis, Chabauty ..., following ideas of Skolem ..., has shown how the method of p-adic completion, with respect to a more or less arbitrary prime p, can yield deep results about varieties over an algebraic number-field; there, as already in Skolem's work, the problem concerns the intersection of an algebraic variety and of a multiplicative group; by p-adic completion, the latter becomes an algebroid variety defined by linear differential equations.
