= Wijsman convergence =

Wijsman convergence is a variation of Hausdorff convergence suitable for work with unbounded sets. Intuitively, Wijsman convergence is to convergence in the Hausdorff metric as pointwise convergence is to uniform convergence.

== History ==
The convergence was defined by Robert Wijsman. The same definition was used earlier by Zdeněk Frolík. Yet earlier, Hausdorff in his book Grundzüge der Mengenlehre defined so called closed limits; for proper metric spaces it is the same as Wijsman convergence.

== Definition ==
Let (X, d) be a metric space and let Cl(X) denote the collection of all d-closed subsets of X. For a point x ∈ X and a set A ∈ Cl(X), set

$$d(x, A) = \inf_{a \in A} d(x, a).$$

A sequence (or net) of sets A_{i} ∈ Cl(X) is said to be Wijsman convergent to A ∈ Cl(X) if, for each x ∈ X,

$$d(x, A_{i}) \to d(x, A).$$

Wijsman convergence induces a topology on Cl(X), known as the Wijsman topology.

== Properties ==
- The Wijsman topology depends very strongly on the metric d. Even if two metrics are uniformly equivalent, they may generate different Wijsman topologies.
- Beer's theorem: if (X, d) is a complete, separable metric space, then Cl(X) with the Wijsman topology is a Polish space, i.e. it is separable and metrizable with a complete metric.
- Cl(X) with the Wijsman topology is always a Tychonoff space. Moreover, one has the Levi-Lechicki theorem: (X, d) is separable if and only if Cl(X) is either metrizable, first-countable or second-countable.
- If the pointwise convergence of Wijsman convergence is replaced by uniform convergence (uniformly in x), then one obtains Hausdorff convergence, where the Hausdorff metric is given by

$$d_{\mathrm{H}} (A, B) = \sup_{x \in X} \big| d(x, A) - d(x, B) \big|.$$

The Hausdorff and Wijsman topologies on Cl(X) coincide if and only if (X, d) is a totally bounded space.

== See also ==
- Hausdorff distance
- Kuratowski convergence
- Vietoris topology
- Hemicontinuity
