= Epi-convergence =

In mathematical analysis, epi-convergence is a type of convergence for real-valued and extended real-valued functions.

Epi-convergence is important because it is the appropriate notion of convergence with which to approximate minimization problems in the field of mathematical optimization. The symmetric notion of hypo-convergence is appropriate for maximization problems. Mosco convergence is a generalization of epi-convergence to infinite dimensional spaces.

== Definition ==
Let $X$ be a metric space, and $f_{n}: X \to \mathbb{R}$ a real-valued function for each natural number $n$. We say that the sequence $(f_{n})$ epi-converges to a function $f: X \to \mathbb{R}$ if for each $x \in X$

$$\begin{align}
& \liminf_{n \to \infty} f_{n}(x_n) \geq f(x) \text{ for every } x_n \to x \text{ and } \\
& \limsup_{n \to \infty} f_n(x_n) \leq f(x) \text{ for some } x_n \to x.
\end{align}$$

=== Extended real-valued extension ===
The following extension allows epi-convergence to be applied to a sequence of functions with non-constant domain.

Denote by $\overline{\mathbb{R}}= \mathbb{R} \cup \{ \pm \infty \}$ the extended real numbers. Let $f_n$ be a function $f_n:X \to \overline{\mathbb{R}}$ for each $n \in \mathbb{N}$. The sequence $(f_n)$ epi-converges to $f: X \to \overline{\mathbb{R}}$ if for each $x \in X$

$$\begin{align}
& \liminf_{n \to \infty} f_{n}(x_n) \geq f(x) \text{ for every } x_n \to x \text{ and } \\
& \limsup_{n \to \infty} f_n(x_n) \leq f(x) \text{ for some } x_n \to x.
\end{align}$$

In fact, epi-convergence coincides with the $\Gamma$-convergence in first countable spaces.

=== Hypo-convergence ===
Epi-convergence is the appropriate topology with which to approximate minimization problems. For maximization problems one uses the symmetric notion of hypo-convergence. $(f_n)$ hypo-converges to $f$ if

$$\limsup_{n \to \infty} f_n(x_n) \leq f(x) \text{ for every } x_n \to x$$

and

$$\liminf_{n \to \infty} f_n(x_n) \geq f(x) \text{ for some } x_n \to x.$$

== Relationship to minimization problems ==
Assume we have a difficult minimization problem

$$\inf_{x \in C} g(x)$$

where $g: X \to \mathbb{R}$ and $C \subseteq X$. We can attempt to approximate this problem by a sequence of easier problems

$$\inf_{x \in C_{n}} g_n(x)$$

for functions $g_n$ and sets $C_n$.

Epi-convergence provides an answer to the question: In what sense should the approximations converge to the original problem in order to guarantee that approximate solutions converge to a solution of the original?

We can embed these optimization problems into the epi-convergence framework by defining extended real-valued functions

$$\begin{align}
f(x) & = \begin{cases} g(x), & x \in C, \\ \infty, & x \not \in C, \end{cases} \\[4pt]
f_n(x) & = \begin{cases} g_n(x), & x \in C_n, \\ \infty, & x \not \in C_n. \end{cases}
\end{align}$$

So that the problems $\inf_{x \in X} f(x)$ and $\inf_{x \in X} f_n(x)$ are equivalent to the original and approximate problems, respectively.

If $(f_n)$ epi-converges to $f$, then $\limsup_{n \to \infty} [\inf f_n] \leq \inf f$. Furthermore, if $x$ is a limit point of minimizers of $f_n$, then $x$ is a minimizer of $f$. In this sense,

$$\lim_{n \to \infty} \operatorname{argmin} f_n \subseteq \operatorname{argmin} f.$$

Epi-convergence is the weakest notion of convergence for which this result holds.

== Properties ==
- $(f_n)$ epi-converges to $f$ if and only if $(-f_n)$ hypo-converges to $-f$.
- $(f_n)$ epi-converges to $f$ if and only if $(\operatorname{epi} f_n)$ converges to $\operatorname{epi} f$ as sets, in the Painlevé–Kuratowski sense of set convergence. Here, $\operatorname{epi} f$ is the epigraph of the function $f$.
- If $f_n$ epi-converges to $f$, then $f$ is lower semi-continuous.
- If $f_n$ is convex for each $n \in \mathbb{N}$ and $(f_n)$ epi-converges to $f$, then $f$ is convex.
- If $f^1_{n} \leq f_n \leq f^2_{n}$ and both $(f^1_n)$ and $(f^2_n)$ epi-converge to $f$, then $(f_n)$ epi-converges to $f$.
- If $(f_n)$ converges uniformly to $f$ on each compact set of $\mathbb{R}_n$ and $(f_n)$ are continuous, then $(f_n)$ epi-converges and hypo-converges to $f$.
- In general, epi-convergence neither implies nor is implied by pointwise convergence. Additional assumptions can be placed on an pointwise convergent family of functions to guarantee epi-convergence.
