= Hausdorff completion =

In algebra, the Hausdorff completion $\widehat{G}$ of a group G with filtration $G_n$ is the inverse limit $\varprojlim G/G_n$ of the discrete group $G/G_n$. A basic example is a profinite completion. The image of the canonical map $G \to \widehat{G}$ is a Hausdorff topological group and its kernel is the intersection of all $G_n$: i.e., the closure of the identity element. The canonical homomorphism $\operatorname{gr}(G) \to \operatorname{gr}(\widehat{G})$ is an isomorphism, where $\operatorname{gr}(G)$ is a graded module associated to the filtration.

The concept is named after Felix Hausdorff.

== See also ==
- Linear topology
