= Hausdorff–Young inequality =

Bound on the norm of Fourier coefficients

The Hausdorff−Young inequality is a foundational result in the mathematical field of Fourier analysis. As a statement about Fourier series, it was discovered by William Henry Young (1913) and extended by Hausdorff (1923). It is now typically understood as a rather direct corollary of the Plancherel theorem, found in 1910, in combination with the Riesz-Thorin theorem, originally discovered by Marcel Riesz in 1927. With this machinery, it readily admits several generalizations, including to multidimensional Fourier series and to the Fourier transform on the real line, Euclidean spaces, as well as more general spaces. With these extensions, it is one of the best-known results of Fourier analysis, appearing in nearly every introductory graduate-level textbook on the subject.

The nature of the Hausdorff-Young inequality can be understood with only Riemann integration and infinite series as prerequisite. Given a continuous function $f:(0,1) \to \mathbb{R}$, define its "Fourier coefficients" by

$$c_n=\int_0^1 e^{-2\pi inx}f(x)\,dx$$

for each integer $n$. The Hausdorff-Young inequality can be used to show that

$$\left(\sum_{n=-\infty}^\infty |c_n|^3\right)^{1/3}\leq
\left(\int_0^{1}|f(t)|^{3/2}\,dt\right)^{2/3}.$$

Loosely speaking, this can be interpreted as saying that the "size" of the function $f$, as represented by the right-hand side of the above inequality, controls the "size" of its sequence of Fourier coefficients, as represented by the left-hand side.

However, this is only a very specific case of the general theorem. The usual formulations of the theorem are given below, with use of the machinery of L^{p} spaces and Lebesgue integration.

== The conjugate exponent ==
Given a nonzero real number $p$, define the real number $p'$ (the "conjugate exponent" of $p$) by the equation

$$\frac{1}{p}+\frac{1}{p'}=1.$$

If $p$ is equal to one, this equation has no solution, but it is interpreted to mean that $p'$ is infinite, as an element of the extended real number line. Likewise, if $p$ is infinite, as an element of the extended real number line, then this is interpreted to mean that $p'$ is equal to one.

The commonly understood features of the conjugate exponent are simple:

- the conjugate exponent of a number in the range $[1,2]$ is in the range $[2,\infty]$
- the conjugate exponent of a number in the range $[2,\infty]$ is in the range $[1,2]$
- the conjugate exponent of $2$ is $2$

== Statements of the theorem ==
=== Fourier series ===
Given a function $f:(0,1)\to\mathbb{C},$ one defines its "Fourier coefficients" as a function $c:\mathbb{Z}\to\mathbb{C}$ by

$$c(n)=\int_0^{1} f(t)e^{-2\pi int}\,dt,$$

although for an arbitrary function $f$, these integrals may not exist. Hölder's inequality shows that if $f$ is in $L^p\bigl((0,1)\bigr)$ for some number $p\in[1,\infty]$, then each Fourier coefficient is well-defined.

The Hausdorff-Young inequality says that, for any number $p$ in the interval $(1,2]$, one has

$$\Big(\sum_{n=-\infty}^\infty \big|c(n)\big|^{p'}\Big)^{1/p'}\leq\Big(\int_0^{1}|f(t)|^p\,dt\Big)^{1/p}$$

for all $f$ in $L^p\bigl((0,1)\bigr)$. Conversely, still supposing $p\in(1,2]$, if $c:\mathbb{Z}\to\mathbb{C}$ is a mapping for which

$$\sum_{n=-\infty}^\infty \big|c(n)\big|^p<\infty,$$

then there exists $f\in L^{p'}(0,1)$ whose Fourier coefficients are $c(n)$ obeying

$$\Big(\int_0^{1}|f(t)|^{p'}\,dt\Big)^{1/p'}\leq\Big(\sum_{n=-\infty}^\infty \big|c(n)\big|^{p}\Big)^{1/p}.$$

=== Multidimensional Fourier series ===
The case of Fourier series generalizes to the multidimensional case. Given a function $f:(0,1)^k\to\mathbb{C},$ define its Fourier coefficients $c:\mathbb{Z}^k\to\mathbb{C}$ by

$$c(n_1,\ldots,n_k)=\int_{(0,1)^k}f(x)e^{-2\pi i(n_1x_1+\cdots+n_kx_k)}\,dx.$$

As in the case of Fourier series, the assumption that $f$ is in $L^p$ for some value of $p$ in $[1,\infty]$ ensures, via the Hölder inequality, the existence of the Fourier coefficients. Now, the Hausdorff-Young inequality says that if $p$ is in the range $[1,2]$, then

$$\Big(\sum_{n\in\mathbb{Z}^k}\big|c(n)\big|^{p'}\Big)^{1/p'}\leq\Big(\int_{(0,1)^k}|f(x)|^p\,dx\Big)^{1/p}$$

for any $f$ in $L^p\bigl((0,1)^k\bigr)$.

=== The Fourier transform ===
One defines the multidimensional Fourier transform by

$$\widehat{f}(\xi)=\int_{\mathbb{R}^n}e^{-2\pi i\langle x,\xi\rangle}f(x)\,dx.$$

The Hausdorff-Young inequality, in this setting, says that if $p$ is a number in the interval $[1,2]$, then one has

$$\Big(\int_{\mathbb{R}^n}\big|\widehat{f}(\xi)\big|^{p'}\,d\xi\Big)^{1/p'}\leq \Big(\int_{\mathbb{R}^n}\big|f(x)\big|^p\,dx\Big)^{1/p}$$

for any $f \in L^p(\mathbb{R}^m)$.

=== The language of normed vector spaces ===
The above results can be rephrased succinctly as:

- The map which sends a function $(0,1)^k \to \mathbb{C}$ to its Fourier coefficients defines a bounded complex-linear map $L^p\bigl((0,1)^k,dx\bigr)\to L^{p/(p-1)}(\mathbb{Z}^k,dn)$ for any number $p$ in the range $[1,2]$. Here $dx$ denotes Lebesgue measure and $dn$ denotes counting measure. Furthermore, the operator norm of this linear map is less than or equal to one.
- The map which sends a function $\mathbb{R}^n \to \mathbb{C}$ to its Fourier transform defines a bounded complex-linear map $L^p(\mathbb{R}^n) \to L^{p/(p-1)}(\mathbb{R}^n)$ for any number $p$ in the range $[1,2]$. Furthermore, the operator norm of this linear map is less than or equal to one.

== Proof ==
Here we use the language of normed vector spaces and bounded linear maps, as is convenient for application of the Riesz-Thorin theorem. There are two ingredients in the proof:

- according to the Plancherel theorem, the Fourier series (or Fourier transform) defines a bounded linear map $L^2\to L^2$.
- using only the single equality $|e^{-2\pi i na}|=1$ for any real numbers $n$ and $a$, one can see directly that the Fourier series (or Fourier transform) defines a bounded linear map $L^1\to L^{\infty}$.

The operator norm of either linear maps is less than or equal to one, as one can directly verify. One can then apply the Riesz–Thorin theorem.

== Beckner's sharp Hausdorff-Young inequality ==
Equality is achieved in the Hausdorff-Young inequality for (multidimensional) Fourier series by taking

$$f(x)=e^{2\pi i(m_1x_1+\cdots+m_kx_k)}$$

for any particular choice of integers $m_1,\ldots,m_k.$ In the above terminology of "normed vector spaces", this asserts that the operator norm of the corresponding bounded linear map is exactly equal to one.

Since the Fourier transform is closely analogous to the Fourier series, and the above Hausdorff-Young inequality for the Fourier transform is proved by exactly the same means as the Hausdorff-Young inequality for Fourier series, it may be surprising that equality is not achieved for the above Hausdorff-Young inequality for the Fourier transform, aside from the special case $p=2$ for which the Plancherel theorem asserts that the Hausdorff-Young inequality is an exact equality.

In fact, Beckner (1975), following a special case appearing in Babenko (1961), showed that if $p$ is a number in the interval $[1,2]$, then

$$\Big(\int_{\mathbb{R}^n}\big|\widehat{f}(\xi)\big|^{p'}\,d\xi\Big)^{1/p'}\leq \Big(\frac{p^{1/p}}{(p')^{1/p'}}\Big)^{n/2}\Big(\int_{\mathbb{R}^n}\big|f(x)\big|^p\,dx\Big)^{1/p}$$

for any $f$ in $L^p(\mathbb{R}^n)$. This is an improvement of the standard Hausdorff-Young inequality, as the context $p\le2$ and $p'\ge2$ ensures that the number appearing on the right-hand side of this "Babenko–Beckner inequality" is less than or equal to 1. Moreover, this number cannot be replaced by a smaller one, since equality is achieved in the case of Gaussian functions. In this sense, Beckner's paper gives an optimal ("sharp") version of the Hausdorff-Young inequality. In the language of normed vector spaces, it says that the operator norm of the bounded linear map $L^p(\mathbb{R}^n)\to L^{p/(p-1)}(\mathbb{R}^n)$, as defined by the Fourier transform, is exactly equal to

$$\Big(\frac{p^{1/p}}{(p')^{1/p'}}\Big)^{n/2}.$$

== The condition on the exponent ==
The condition $p \in [1, 2]$ is essential. If $p > 2$, then the fact that a function belongs to $L^p$ does not give any additional information on the order of growth of its Fourier series beyond the fact that it is in $\ell^2$.
