= Morenu =

Jewish man with high religious education

Morenu (Hebrew: מורנו, lit. "our teacher") is a customary religious title for a Jewish man with high religious education. This term has been used since the mid-14th century and has a Talmudic origin. The title is generally considered a prerequisite for fulfilling the duties of a rabbi. This title was placed before the name of the scholar in question. For example, the abbreviation MaHaRaL stands for Morenu ha-Rav Loew. "This title was first used in Germany, and after R. Meïr b. Baruk ha-Levi, rabbi of Vienna (1360–90), had revived the ancient custom of ordination ("semikhah"), every one ordained as rabbi received the degree of morenu. The first who bore this title were, according to David Gans, R. Shalom of Austria, rabbi of Wiener-Neustadt, and R. Jacob Mölln (MaHaRiL)".

== See also ==
- Haredi Judaism
- Honorifics in Judaism
- Rav
