= Mosco convergence =

Notion of convergence for functionals

In mathematical analysis, Mosco convergence is a notion of convergence for functionals that is used in nonlinear analysis and set-valued analysis. Named after the Italian mathematician Umberto Mosco, it is a particular case of Γ-convergence. Mosco convergence is sometimes phrased as “weak Γ-liminf and strong Γ-limsup” convergence since it uses both the weak and strong topologies on a topological vector space X. In finite dimensional spaces, Mosco convergence coincides with epi-convergence, while in infinite-dimensional spaces, Mosco convergence is a strictly stronger property.

== Definition ==
Let X be a topological vector space and let X^{∗} denote the dual space of continuous linear functionals on X. Let F_{n} : X → [0, +∞] be functionals on X for each n = 1, 2, ... The sequence (or, more generally, net) (F_{n}) is said to Mosco converge to another functional F : X → [0, +∞] if the following two conditions hold:

- lower bound inequality: for each sequence of elements x_{n} ∈ X converging weakly to x ∈ X,

$$\liminf_{n \to \infty} F_{n} (x_{n}) \geq F(x);$$

- upper bound inequality: for every x ∈ X there exists an approximating sequence of elements x_{n} ∈ X, converging strongly to x, such that

$$\limsup_{n \to \infty} F_{n} (x_{n}) \leq F(x).$$

Since lower and upper bound inequalities of this type are used in the definition of Γ-convergence, Mosco convergence is sometimes phrased as “weak Γ-liminf and strong Γ-limsup” convergence. Mosco convergence is sometimes abbreviated to M-convergence and denoted by

$$\mathop{\text{M-lim}}_{n \to \infty} F_{n} = F \text{ or } F_{n} \xrightarrow[n \to \infty]{\mathrm{M}} F.$$
