= Hausdorff Center for Mathematics =

Mathematics research center in Germany

Coordinates: 50°43′41″N 7°05′02″E

The Hausdorff Center for Mathematics (HCM) is a research center in Bonn, formed by the four mathematical institutes of the Rheinische Friedrich-Wilhelms-Universität Bonn (Mathematical Institute, Institute for Applied Mathematics, Institute for Numerical Simulation, Research Institute for Discrete Mathematics), the Max Planck Institute for Mathematics (MPIM), and the Institute for Social and Economic Sciences.

== History ==
The Hausdorff Center was established in 2006 as one of the seventeen national Clusters of Excellence that were part of the German government's Excellence Initiative. It was officially opened with a colloquium on 19 and 20 January 2007. In 2012, a second funding period was granted, and in 2018, it was followed by a third funding period. It was ranked 14th in the world for mathematics by the Academic Ranking of World Universities in 2021.

The center is named after the mathematician Felix Hausdorff (born 8 November 1868; died 26 January 1942).

== Organization ==
The spokesperson of the HCM is Martin Rumpf. Altogether, about 70 professors from Bonn are affiliated with the HCM: all professors for Mathematics, of the MPI, and for Theoretical Economy. These include the director of the MPI, Peter Scholze, who was awarded the Fields Medal in 2018.

The Hausdorff Research Institute for Mathematics (HIM) and the Hausdorff School for Mathematics (HSM) are part of the Hausdorff Center:

- The Hausdorff Research Institute for Mathematics (HIM) organizes international long-term programs and fosters cooperations between German mathematicians and internationally renowned scientists in mathematics and mathematical economics. It also runs specific programs for young scientists. Director of the HIM is Stefan Müller.
- The Hausdorff School for Mathematics (HSM) is the central institution serving all early-career researchers in mathematics at Bonn: from PhD students to advanced postdocs. Director is Margherita Disertori.
