= Grundzüge der Mengenlehre =

1914 book by Felix Hausdorff

- First edition
- Author: Felix Hausdorff
- Translator: John R. Aumann et al. (English translation)
- Language: German
- Subject: Set theory, mathematics
- Genre: Non-fiction
- Publication date: April 1914
- Publication place: Germany
- English publication date: 1957

Grundzüge der Mengenlehre (English: Basics of Set Theory) is a book on set theory written by Felix Hausdorff.

First published in April 1914, Grundzüge der Mengenlehre was the first comprehensive introduction to set theory. In addition to the systematic treatment of known results in set theory, the book also contains chapters on measure theory and topology, which were then still considered parts of set theory. Hausdorff presented and developed original material that later became the basis for those areas.

In 1927, Hausdorff published an extensively revised second edition under the title Mengenlehre (English: Set Theory), omitting many topics from the first edition. In 1935, a third German edition was released, which in 1957 was translated into English by John R. Aumann et al. under the title Set Theory.
