= Earle Hesse Kennard =

US theoretical physicist (1885–1968)

- Born: August 2, 1885; Columbus, Ohio
- Died: January 31, 1968 (aged 82); Claremont, California
- Citizenship: United States
- Known for: Kennard phase Proving the Uncertainty principle
- Scientific career
- Fields: Mathematical physics
- Workplaces: Cornell University; David Taylor Model Basin

Earle Hesse Kennard (August 2, 1885 – January 31, 1968) was a US theoretical physicist and professor at Cornell University.

== Biography ==
Kennard was born in Columbus, Ohio and studied at Pomona College and Oxford University as part of a Rhodes Scholarship. He went on to earn his Ph.D. from Cornell in 1913, where he would continue most of his scientific career. During a 1926 sabbatical spent at the University of Göttingen, he learned the newly developing quantum mechanics of Werner Heisenberg, Max Born and Pascual Jordan. With this knowledge, he derived the first rigorous form of the uncertainty principle and fully solved several simple quantum mechanics problems for the first time. In 1926, he was appointed professor of physics at Cornell, which he remained until 1946.

In 1941, still at Cornell, he became a part-time consultant at the David Taylor Model Basin (DTMB), the United States Navy modelling facility. In the period 1946–49 he was the head of the hydromechanics laboratory, and from 1950 until 1957 he was head of the structural mechanics laboratory. From 1957 until his retirement in 1960 he was a general scientific consultant to the commanding officer of the DTMB. Also after his retirement he continued to work for the DTMB under contract. Much of his research for the Navy focussed on hydrodynamics and elasticity, in particular on the theory of potential flow, the physics of underwater explosions and structural vibrations.

In 2018, more than 90 years after its prediction by Kennard, the first experimental observation of the Kennard phase was achieved by a collaboration of researchers from Israeli, German, and American universities.

== Bibliography ==
- Kennard, E.H. (1938). Kinetic theory of gases. McGraw-Hill. ISBN 978-0-571-26658-6. OCLC 000537197.
- Richtmyer, F.K.; Kennard, E.H.; Cooper, J.N. (1969). Introduction to modern physics (6th ed.). McGraw-Hill. ISBN 0-07-052506-4. Originally by Richtmyer in 1928. Also the 1934, 1942, and 1955 editions are co-authored with Kennard (and later also with T. Lauritsen and J.N. Cooper).
