= Stronger uncertainty relations =

Later developments of Heisenberg's principle

Heisenberg's uncertainty relation is one of the fundamental results in quantum mechanics. Later Robertson proved the uncertainty relation for two general non-commuting observables, which was strengthened by Schrödinger. However, the conventional uncertainty relation like the Robertson-Schrödinger relation cannot give a non-trivial bound for the product of variances of two incompatible observables because the lower bound in the uncertainty inequalities can be null and hence trivial even for observables that are incompatible on the state of the system. The Heisenberg–Robertson–Schrödinger uncertainty relation was proved at the dawn of quantum formalism and is ever-present in the teaching and research on quantum mechanics. After about 85 years of existence of the uncertainty relation this problem was solved recently by Lorenzo Maccone and Arun K. Pati. The standard uncertainty relations are expressed in terms of the product of variances of the measurement results of the observables $A$ and $B$, and the product can be null even when one of the two variances is different from zero. However, the stronger uncertainty relations due to Maccone and Pati provide different uncertainty relations, based on the sum of variances that are guaranteed to be nontrivial whenever the observables are incompatible on the state of the quantum system. (Earlier works on uncertainty relations formulated as the sum of variances include, e.g., He et al., and Ref. due to Huang.)

== The Maccone–Pati uncertainty relations ==
The Heisenberg–Robertson or Schrödinger uncertainty relations do not fully capture the incompatibility of observables in a given quantum state. The stronger uncertainty relations give non-trivial bounds on the sum of the variances for two incompatible observables. For two non-commuting observables $A$ and $B$ the first stronger uncertainty relation is given by

$$\Delta A^2 + \Delta B^2 \ge \pm i \langle \Psi|[A, B]|\Psi \rangle  + | \langle \Psi|(A \pm i B)|{\bar \Psi} \rangle|^2,$$

where $\Delta A^2 = \langle \Psi |A^2 |\Psi \rangle - \langle \Psi |A |\Psi \rangle^2$, $\Delta B^2 = \langle \Psi |B^2 |\Psi \rangle - \langle \Psi |B |\Psi \rangle^2$, $|{\bar \Psi} \rangle$ is a vector that is orthogonal to the state of the system, i.e., $\langle \Psi| {\bar \Psi} \rangle = 0$ and one should choose the sign of $\pm i \langle \Psi|[A, B]|\Psi \rangle$ so that this is a positive number.

The other non-trivial stronger uncertainty relation is given by

$$\Delta A^2 + \Delta B^2 \ge \frac{1}{2}| \langle {\bar \Psi}_{A+B} |(A + B)| \Psi \rangle|^2,$$

where $| {\bar \Psi}_{A+B} \rangle$ is a unit vector orthogonal to $|\Psi \rangle$. The form of $| {\bar \Psi}_{A+B} \rangle$ implies that the right-hand side of the new uncertainty relation is nonzero unless $| \Psi\rangle$ is an eigenstate of $(A + B)$.

One can prove an improved version of the Heisenberg–Robertson uncertainty relation which reads as

$$\Delta A \Delta B \ge  \frac{ \pm  \frac{i}{2} \langle \Psi|[A, B]|\Psi \rangle }{1- \frac{1}{2} | \langle \Psi|( \frac{A}{\Delta A}  \pm i  \frac{B}{\Delta B} )| {\bar \Psi} \rangle|^2 }.$$

The Heisenberg–Robertson uncertainty relation follows from the above uncertainty relation.

== Remarks ==
In quantum theory, one should distinguish between the uncertainty relation and the uncertainty principle. The former refers solely to the preparation of the system which induces a spread in the measurement outcomes, and does not refer to the disturbance induced by the measurement. The uncertainty principle captures the measurement disturbance by the apparatus and the impossibility of joint measurements of incompatible observables. The Maccone–Pati uncertainty relations refer to preparation uncertainty relations. These relations set strong limitations for the nonexistence of common eigenstates for incompatible observables. The Maccone–Pati uncertainty relations have been experimentally tested for qutrit systems. The new uncertainty relations not only capture the incompatibility of observables but also of quantities that are physically measurable (as variances can be measured in the experiment).

== Other sources ==
- Research Highlight, NATURE ASIA, 19 January 2015, "Heisenberg's uncertainty relation gets stronger"
