= List of Wesleyan University administration and faculty =

This is a partial list of notable people affiliated with Wesleyan University. It includes alumni and faculty of the institution.

== Administration and faculty ==
=== Academia, past and present ===
- Debby Applegate – former faculty, American history, 2007 Pulitzer Prize for Biography or Autobiography
- Hannah Arendt – fellow 1961–1963, Center for Advanced Studies (now the Center for the Humanities), political theorist
- Wilbur Olin Atwater (1865 Wesleyan B.S.) – first professor of chemistry; first to quantify the calorie; pioneer, utilization of respiration calorimeter
- Reginald Bartholomew – former professor of government; former U.S. Ambassador to Italy, to Spain, to Lebanon
- Edgar S. Brightman – faculty 1915–19, philosopher, promulgated the philosophy known as Boston personalism
- Nathan Brody – emeritus professor of psychology; known for his work on intelligence and personality
- Norman O. Brown – faculty 1946–196?; professor of classics; wrote "Love's Body" and Life Against Death
- Judith Butler – faculty 1984–86; philosopher and gender studies scholar
- Walter Guyton Cady – faculty 1902–46; professor of physics; Duddell Medal and Prize
- Erica Chenoweth – faculty 2008–12; political scientist, expert on civil resistance movements, Grawemeyer Award winner
- Joanne V. Creighton – faculty 1990–94; professor of English; interim president, Wesleyan; 17th president, Mount Holyoke College; interim president, Haverford College
- Raymond Dodge – former professor of psychology; experimental psychologist
- Henry Duckworth – faculty 1946–51; professor of physics; president, Royal Society of Canada (1971–72)
- Alex Dupuy – professor emeritus of sociology
- John Price Durbin – professor of natural science; Chaplain of the Senate, president of Dickinson College
- Luigi R. Einaudi – former faculty; professor of government; acting Secretary General of the Organization of American States (2004–05)
- Max Farrand – former professor of history
- Stephen O. Garrison – founder of the Vineland Training School
- Leslie H. Gelb – faculty 1964–67, department of history; Pulitzer Prize for Explanatory Reporting; director of project that produced the Pentagon Papers
- Richard N. Goodwin – fellow 1965–67, Center for Advanced Studies; advisor, speech writer to U.S. Presidents Kennedy, Johnson, and Senator Robert F. Kennedy
- Lori Gruen – current faculty, professor of philosophy, working at the intersections of ethical theory and ethical practice
- Philip Hallie – faculty for 32 years, philosopher; developed the model of institutional cruelty
- Gustav Hedlund – mathematician, one of the founders of symbolic and topological dynamics; visiting professor of mathematics
- Masami Imai – current faculty, economist
- Karl William Kapp – faculty 1945–50; professor of economics; one of the leading 20th-century institutional economists
- Eugene Marion Klaaren – emeritus professor, historian and professor of religion
- Stanley Lebergott – emeritus professor, American-government economist and professor of economics; noted for historical unemployment statistics
- Charles Lemert – emeritus professor, social theorist and sociologist
- Clarence D. Long – former professor of economics; former member, U.S. Council of Economic Advisers, under President Dwight Eisenhower (1953–54, 1956–57)
- Andrei Markovits – professor of comparative politics and German studies (1977–83)
- Elizabeth A. McAlister — Professor of Religion, American Studies, African American Studies, and Feminist, Gender, and Sexuality Studies
- David McClelland (1938 Wesleyan B.S.) – professor of psychology in the early 1950s
- David McCullough – scholar-in-residence 1982, 1983; two National Book Awards (1978, 1982); two Pulitzer Prizes for Biography or Autobiography (1993, 2002); Presidential Medal of Freedom
- Louis Mink – faculty 1952–1983; philosopher of history; responsible for what would later be called the linguistic turn in philosophy of history
- Daniel Patrick Moynihan – fellow 1964–67, Center for Advanced Studies; later U.S. Senator, New York
- Lawrence Olson – faculty 1966–1988; historian specializing in Japan; developed the Asian-studies program at Wesleyan
- Satoshi Omura – visiting faculty in the early 1970s, honorary Max Tishler Professor of Chemistry, 2005; awarded honorary Doctor of Science, 1994; 2015 recipient of the Nobel Prize in Physiology or Medicine
- Scott Plous – current faculty, professor of psychology
- Nelson W. Polsby – former faculty, political scientist; known for study of U.S. presidency and U.S. Congress
- Nathan Pusey – former faculty, department of classics; later president of Lawrence University and 24th President of Harvard University
- William North Rice (1865 Wesleyan graduate) – professor of geology
- Francisco Rodríguez – former professor of economics and Latin American studies
- Dana Royer – current faculty, professor of earth & environmental sciences
- Walter Warwick Sawyer – faculty 1958–65, professor of mathematics
- Hon. Barry R. Schaller – current faculty, teaches bioethics and public-health law, ethics and policy; associate justice, Connecticut Supreme Court
- Elmer Eric Schattschneider – faculty, 1930–60, political scientist, namesake for award for best dissertation in U. S. in field of American politics
- Carl E. Schorske – professor of history in the 1950s; Pulitzer Prize for History and MacArthur Fellowship
- Frederick Slocum – first professor of astronomy, director of the Van Vleck Observatory (1915–44)
- Richard Slotkin (MAAE Wesleyan graduate) – Olin Professor of English and American Studies, emeritus; American Academy of Arts and Sciences
- William L. Storrs – faculty 1841–46, professor of law; also Congressman from Connecticut; Chief Justice of the Connecticut Supreme Court
- Max Tishler – faculty 1970–89, professor, chemistry; National Medal of Science, Priestley Medal, National Inventors Hall of Fame
- Hing Tong – former chairman, mathematics department; known for providing the original proof of the Katětov–Tong insertion theorem
- Charles Kittredge True – faculty 1849–60, professor of intellectual and moral science
- Jennifer Tucker – historian and biologist
- John Monroe Van Vleck (1850 Wesleyan graduate) – faculty 1853–1904, emeritus 1904–12, professor of mathematics and astronomy
- Clarence E. Walker – associate professor of history
- Jan Willis – emeritus professor of religion and East Asian Studies
- Woodrow Wilson – faculty 1888–90; professor, chair, history and political economy; 13th president, Princeton University; 28th President, United States; Nobel Peace Prize
- Robert Coldwell Wood – former faculty, political scientist; former 1st Undersecretary and 2nd United States Secretary of Housing and Urban Development (1963–69)
- John Wrench – former professor of mathematics, pioneer in using computers for mathematical calculations; National Academy of Sciences
- Gary Yohe – current faculty, professor of economics; senior member, coordinating lead author, Intergovernmental Panel on Climate Change; co-recipient, 2007 Nobel Peace Prize
- Elisabeth Young-Bruehl – faculty 1974–c. 1995; biographer and psychotherapist

=== Arts and letters, past and present ===
- Chimamanda Ngozi Adichie – visiting writer 2008; MacArthur Fellowship (2008)
- John Ashbery – Millet Writing Fellow 2010; MacArthur Fellowship; 1976 Pulitzer Prize for Poetry; National Book Award, National Book Critics Circle Award
- Jeanine Basinger – current faculty, c. 1970–present, film scholar
- Anselm Berrigan – current faculty, poet, Best American Poetry of 2002, 2004
- Ed Blackwell – artist in residence, late 1970s; recorded extensively with Ornette Coleman
- Anthony Braxton – John Spencer Camp Professor of Music, retired 2013; MacArthur Fellowship; 2014 National Endowment for the Arts Jazz Master
- Robert E. Brown – faculty 1962–1979, professor of music, founded ethnomusicology program at Wesleyan
- Neely Bruce – current faculty, professor of music; composer, conductor, pianist, scholar of American music
- John Cage – faculty 1961, 1968, composer; affiliated with Wesleyan and collaborated with members of its Music Department from 1950s until his death in 1992
- Tony Connor – current faculty, British poet and playwright, Fellow of the Royal Society of Literature
- Junot Díaz – Millet Writing Fellow 2009; 2008 Pulitzer Prize for Fiction, National Book Critics Circle Award; MacArthur Fellowship (2012)
- Annie Dillard – English faculty for 21 years; 1975 Pulitzer Prize for General Nonfiction
- Eiko & Koma – MacArthur Fellowship; Japanese performance duo; Eiko is current faculty
- T. S. Eliot – Nobel Prize in Literature (1948), Presidential Medal of Freedom (1964); in the 1960s, special editorial consultant to Wesleyan University Press
- Jimmy Garrison – artist in residence, ?–1976, bassist; long association with John Coltrane
- Angel Gil-Ordoñez – former professor of music and Director of Orchestra Studies; Spanish conductor
- Dana Gioia – visiting writer 1986–1989, American Book Award; chairman, National Endowment for the Arts (2003–2009)
- Roger Mathew Grant – current faculty, expert in music theory
- Donald Hall – 14th United States Poet Laureate, 2006–07; National Book Critics Circle Award, 1955; member, editorial board for poetry, Wesleyan University Press (1958–64)
- Jon B. Higgins (Wesleyan B.A., M.A., PhD) – faculty 1978–84, scholar and performer of Carnatic Music, Fulbright Scholar
- Ana Paula Höfling – professor of dance
- Jay Hoggard (Wesleyan B.A. 1976) – current faculty, vibraphonist
- Paul Horgan – adjunct professor of English, 1961–71; professor emeritus and permanent author-in-residence, 1971–95; twice winner, Pulitzer Prize for History (1955 and 1976); Bancroft Prize for History
- Susan Howe – distinguished visiting writer and faculty 2010–11, 2011 Bollingen Prize
- Quiara Alegría Hudes – Shapiro Distinguished Professor of Writing and Theater 2014–2016, visiting writer 2011–12; 2012 Pulitzer Prize for Drama
- Paul LaFarge – writer, English faculty as of 2010; taught writing at the university on and off since 2002
- Alvin Lucier – John Spencer Camp Professor of Music 1970–2010; pioneering experimental composer
- William Manchester – faculty 1955–2004; former emeritus professor of history; 2001 National Humanities Medal; The Death of a President, American Caesar
- David P. McAllester – faculty 1947–86; professor, anthropology and music; co-founded Society for Ethnomusicology
- Makanda Ken McIntyre – former professor of music
- Lisa Moore – current faculty, international classical and jazz pianist
- V. S. Naipaul – former visiting professor; Nobel Prize in Literature in fiction (2001); Man Booker Prize (1971)
- Palghat Kollengode Viswanatha Narayanaswamy – artist in residence; considered to be among the finest Carnatic vocalists of the 20th century
- Ramnad Raghavan – faculty for many years, South Indian virtuoso of the mridangam
- S. Ramanathan (Wesleyan PhD, ethnomusicology) – faculty, singer (Carnatic music), and musicologist
- T. Ranganathan – first artist in residence, beginning in 1963; Carnatic virtuoso of the mridangam
- Jean Redpath – artist in residence, 1972–76
- Kit Reed – science- and speculative-fiction writer, resident writer and creative writing faculty, 2008–2017
- F.D. Reeve – faculty 1962–2002 (English and Russian literature), emeritus professor of letters (2002–2013); poet, translator
- Mary Kring Risley - ceramicist, adjunct associate professor of art
- Phyllis Rose – faculty 1969–2005, professor of English; literary critic, essayist, biographer
- George Saunders – visiting writer, MacArthur Fellowship (2006)
- Jonathan Schell – journalist, author, visiting professor in writing 2000–02
- Dani Shapiro – current faculty, professor of creative writing
- Paula Sharp – former writer in residence in the College of Letters (2003–12)
- Joseph Siry – current faculty, leading architectural historian, professor of art and art history
- Mark Slobin – current faculty, professor of music
- Charles Wilbert Snow – faculty 1921–1952; poet, professor of English; coach, debate team; founder, The Cardinal (literary magazine); Lieutenant Governor and Governor of Connecticut
- Anuradha Sriram – India playback singer
- Mark Strand – former visiting professor; fourth United States Poet Laureate, 1990–91; MacArthur Fellowship; 1999 Pulitzer Prize for Poetry
- Sumarsam (Wesleyan M.A. 1976) – current faculty, former artist in residence; Javanese virtuoso, scholar of the gamelan
- Marcus Thompson – former faculty, violist and viola d'amore player, recording artist and educator
- Clifford Thornton – faculty 1969–75, jazz composer and musician, UNESCO counsellor on African-American education 1976–87, Black Panther Minister of Art
- Deb Olin Unferth – former professor of English and creative writing; nominee, 2012 National Book Critics Circle Award; Pushcart Prizes 2005, 2011
- T. Viswanathan (Wesleyan PhD, ethnomusicology 1975) – former professor of music, Carnatic flute virtuoso, 1992 National Heritage Fellowship recipient
- Richard Wilbur – faculty c. 1950–80; professor of English; second United States Poet Laureate; twice winner, Pulitzer Prize (1957, 1989); Bollingen Prize
- Elizabeth Willis – current faculty, poet; teaches creative writing and literature
- Michiyo Yagi – visiting professor in late 1980s; Japanese musician, koto virtuoso
- Gorō Yamaguchi – artist in residence, Japanese shakuhachi (vertical bamboo flute) virtuoso
