= Michael selection theorem =

Theorem in functional analysis

In functional analysis, a branch of mathematics, Michael selection theorem is a selection theorem named after Ernest Michael. In its most popular form, it states the following:

Michael Selection Theorem—Let X be a paracompact space and Y be a separable Banach space. Let $F\colon X\to Y$ be a lower hemicontinuous set-valued function with nonempty convex closed values. Then there exists a continuous selection $f\colon X \to Y$ of F.

Conversely, if any lower semicontinuous multimap from topological space X to a Banach space, with nonempty convex closed values, admits a continuous selection, then X is paracompact. This provides another characterization for paracompactness.

== Examples ==

=== A function that satisfies all requirements ===
The function: $F(x)= [1-x/2, ~1-x/4]$, shown by the grey area in the figure at the right, is a set-valued function from the real interval [0,1] to itself. It satisfies all Michael's conditions, and indeed it has a continuous selection, for example: $f(x)= 1-x/2$ or $f(x)= 1-3x/8$.

=== A function that does not satisfy lower hemicontinuity ===
The function

$$F(x)=
\begin{cases}
3/4           & 0 \le x < 0.5 \\
\left[0,1\right]        & x = 0.5 \\
1/4           & 0.5 < x \le 1
\end{cases}$$

is a set-valued function from the real interval [0,1] to itself. It has nonempty convex closed values. However, it is not lower hemicontinuous at 0.5. Indeed, Michael's theorem does not apply and the function does not have a continuous selection: any selection at 0.5 is necessarily discontinuous.

== Applications ==
Michael selection theorem can be applied to show that the differential inclusion

$$\frac{dx}{dt}(t)\in F(t,x(t)), \quad x(t_0)=x_0$$

has a C^{1} solution when F is lower semi-continuous and F(t, x) is a nonempty closed and convex set for all (t, x). When F is single valued, this is the classic Peano existence theorem.

== Generalizations ==
A theorem due to Deutsch and Kenderov generalizes Michel selection theorem to an equivalence relating approximate selections to almost lower hemicontinuity, where $F$ is said to be almost lower hemicontinuous if at each $x \in X$, all neighborhoods $V$ of $0$ there exists a neighborhood $U$ of $x$ such that $\cap_{u\in U} \{F(u)+V\} \ne \emptyset.$

Precisely, Deutsch–Kenderov theorem states that if $X$ is paracompact, $Y$ a normed vector space and $F (x)$ is nonempty convex for each $x \in X$, then $F$ is almost lower hemicontinuous if and only if $F$ has continuous approximate selections, that is, for each neighborhood $V$ of $0$ in $Y$ there is a continuous function $f \colon X \mapsto Y$ such that for each $x \in X$, $f (x) \in F (X) + V$.

In a note Xu proved that Deutsch–Kenderov theorem is also valid if $Y$ is a locally convex topological vector space.

== See also ==
- Zero-dimensional Michael selection theorem
- Selection theorem
- Maximum theorem
