= Maximum theorem =

Provides conditions for a parametric optimization problem to have continuous solutions

The maximum theorem provides conditions for the continuity of an optimized function and the set of its maximizers with respect to its parameters. The statement was first proven by Claude Berge in 1959. The theorem is primarily used in mathematical economics and optimal control.

== Statement of theorem ==
Maximum Theorem. Let $X$ and $\Theta$ be topological spaces, $f:X\times\Theta\to\mathbb{R}$ be a continuous function on the product $X \times \Theta$, and $C:\Theta\rightrightarrows X$ be a compact-valued correspondence such that $C(\theta) \ne \emptyset$ for all $\theta \in \Theta$. Define the marginal function (or value function) $f^* : \Theta \to \mathbb{R}$ by

$$f^*(\theta)=\sup\{f(x, \theta) : x\in C(\theta)\}$$

and the set of maximizers $C^* : \Theta \rightrightarrows X$ by

$$C^*(\theta)=
\mathrm{arg}\max\{f(x,\theta) : x \in C(\theta)\}
= \{x \in C(\theta) : f(x, \theta) = f^*(\theta)\}$$.

If $C$ is continuous (i.e. both upper and lower hemicontinuous) at $\theta$, then the value function $f^*$ is continuous, and the set of maximizers $C^*$ is upper-hemicontinuous with nonempty and compact values. As a consequence, the $\sup$ may be replaced by $\max$.

== Variants ==
The maximum theorem can be used for minimization by considering the function $-f$ instead.

== Interpretation ==
The theorem is typically interpreted as providing conditions for a parametric optimization problem to have continuous solutions with regard to the parameter. In this case, $\Theta$ is the parameter space, $f(x,\theta)$ is the function to be maximized, and $C(\theta)$ gives the constraint set that $f$ is maximized over. Then, $f^*(\theta)$ is the maximized value of the function and $C^*$ is the set of points that maximize $f$.

The result is that if the elements of an optimization problem are sufficiently continuous, then some, but not all, of that continuity is preserved in the solutions.

== Proof ==
Throughout this proof we will use the term neighborhood to refer to an open set containing a particular point. We preface with a preliminary lemma, which is a general fact in the calculus of correspondences. Recall that a correspondence is closed if its graph is closed.

Lemma. If $A, B : \Theta \rightrightarrows X$ are correspondences, $A$ is upper hemicontinuous and compact-valued, and $B$ is closed, then $A \cap B : \Theta \rightrightarrows X$ defined by $(A \cap B) (\theta) = A(\theta) \cap B(\theta)$ is upper hemicontinuous.

Proof

Let $\theta \in \Theta$, and suppose $G$ is an open set containing $(A\cap B)(\theta)$. If $A(\theta) \subseteq G$, then the result follows immediately. Otherwise, observe that for each $x \in A(\theta) \setminus G$ we have $x \notin B(\theta)$, and since $B$ is closed there is a neighborhood $U_x \times V_x$ of $(\theta, x)$ in which $x' \notin B(\theta')$ whenever $(\theta', x') \in U_x \times V_x$. The collection of sets $\{G\} \cup \{V_x : x \in A(\theta) \setminus G\}$ forms an open cover of the compact set $A(\theta)$, which allows us to extract a finite subcover $G, V_{x_1}, \dots, V_{x_n}$. By upper hemicontinuity, there is a neighborhood $U_\theta$ of $\theta$ such that $A(U_\theta)\subseteq G \cup V_{x_1} \cup \dots \cup V_{x_n}$. Then whenever $\theta' \in U_\theta\cap U_{x_1} \cap \dots \cap U_{x_n}$, we have $A(\theta') \subseteq G \cup V_{x_1} \cup \dots \cup V_{x_n}$, and so $(A \cap B)(\theta') \subseteq G$. This completes the proof. $\square$

The continuity of $f^*$ in the maximum theorem is the result of combining two independent theorems together.

Theorem 1. If $f$ is upper semicontinuous and $C$ is upper hemicontinuous, nonempty and compact-valued, then $f^*$ is upper semicontinuous.

Proof of Theorem 1

Fix $\theta \in \Theta$, and let $\varepsilon > 0$ be arbitrary. For each $x \in C(\theta)$, there exists a neighborhood $U_x \times V_x$ of $(\theta, x)$ such that whenever $(\theta', x') \in U_x \times V_x$, we have $f(x', \theta') < f(x, \theta) + \varepsilon$. The set of neighborhoods $\{V_x : x \in C(\theta)\}$ covers $C(\theta)$, which is compact, so $V_{x_1}, \dots, V_{x_n}$ suffice. Furthermore, since $C$ is upper hemicontinuous, there exists a neighborhood $U'$ of $\theta$ such that whenever $\theta' \in U'$ it follows that $C(\theta') \subseteq \bigcup_{k=1}^{n} V_{x_k}$. Let $U = U' \cap U_{x_1} \cap \dots \cap U_{x_n}$. Then for all $\theta' \in U$, we have $f(x', \theta') < f(x_k, \theta) + \varepsilon$ for each $x' \in C(\theta')$, as $x' \in V_{x_k}$ for some $k$. It follows that

$$f^*(\theta') = \sup_{x' \in C(\theta')} f(x', \theta') < \max_{k=1, \dots, n} f(x_k, \theta) + \varepsilon \leq f^*(\theta) + \varepsilon,$$

which was desired. $\square$

Theorem 2. If $f$ is lower semicontinuous and $C$ is lower hemicontinuous, then $f^*$ is lower semicontinuous.

Proof of Theorem 2

Fix $\theta \in \Theta$, and let $\varepsilon > 0$ be arbitrary. By definition of $f^*$, there exists $x \in C(\theta)$ such that $f^*(\theta) < f(x,\theta) + \frac{\varepsilon}{2}$. Now, since $f$ is lower semicontinuous, there exists a neighborhood $U_1 \times V$ of $(\theta, x)$ such that whenever $(\theta', x') \in U_1 \times V$ we have $f(x, \theta) < f(x', \theta') + \frac{\varepsilon}{2}$. Observe that $C(\theta) \cap V \ne \emptyset$ (in particular, $x \in C(\theta) \cap V$). Therefore, since $C$ is lower hemicontinuous, there exists a neighborhood $U_2$ such that whenever $\theta' \in U_2$ there exists $x' \in C(\theta') \cap V$. Let $U = U_1 \cap U_2$. Then whenever $\theta' \in U$ there exists $x' \in C(\theta') \cap V$, which implies

$$f^*(\theta) < f(x, \theta) + \frac{\varepsilon}{2} < f(x', \theta') + \varepsilon \leq f^*(\theta') + \varepsilon$$

which was desired. $\square$

Under the hypotheses of the Maximum theorem, $f^*$ is continuous. It remains to verify that $C^*$ is an upper hemicontinuous correspondence with compact values. Let $\theta \in \Theta$. To see that $C^*(\theta)$ is nonempty, observe that the function $f_\theta : C(\theta) \to \mathbb{R}$ by $f_\theta(x) = f(x, \theta)$ is continuous on the compact set $C(\theta)$. The Extreme Value theorem implies that $C^*(\theta)$ is nonempty. In addition, since $f_\theta$ is continuous, it follows that $C^*(\theta)$ a closed subset of the compact set $C(\theta)$, which implies $C^*(\theta)$ is compact. Finally, let $D : \Theta \rightrightarrows X$ be defined by $D(\theta) = \{x \in X : f(x, \theta) = f^*(\theta)\}$. Since $f$ is a continuous function, $D$ is a closed correspondence. Moreover, since $C^*(\theta) = C(\theta) \cap D(\theta)$, the preliminary Lemma implies that $C^*$ is upper hemicontinuous. $\square$

== Variants and generalizations ==
A natural generalization from the above results gives sufficient local conditions for $f^*$ to be continuous and $C^*$ to be nonempty, compact-valued, and upper semi-continuous.

If in addition to the conditions above, $f$ is quasiconcave in $x$ for each $\theta$ and $C$ is convex-valued, then $C^*$ is also convex-valued. If $f$ is strictly quasiconcave in $x$ for each $\theta$ and $C$ is convex-valued, then $C^*$ is single-valued, and thus is a continuous function rather than a correspondence.

If $f$ is concave in $X \times \Theta$ and $C$ has a convex graph, then $f^*$ is concave and $C^*$ is convex-valued. Similarly to above, if $f$ is strictly concave, then $C^*$ is a continuous function.

It is also possible to generalize Berge's theorem to non-compact correspondences if the objective function is K-inf-compact.

== Examples ==
=== Specific function ===
Let the parameter space be $\Theta = \mathbb{R}$ and the choice space be $X = \mathbb{R}$. Consider the continuous objective function

$$f(x,\theta) = -(x-\theta)^2,$$

together with the constant constraint correspondence

$$C(\theta) = [-1, 1] \quad \text{for all } \theta \in \mathbb{R},$$

which is compact-valued and continuous (it does not vary with $\theta$).

The value function and the set of maximizers are

$$f^*(\theta) = \max_{x \in [-1,1]} -(x-\theta)^2, \qquad C^*(\theta) = \arg\max_{x \in [-1,1]} -(x-\theta)^2.$$

Since $f$ is maximized by taking $x$ as close to $\theta$ as the constraint allows, the unique maximizer is the projection of $\theta$ onto $[-1,1]$:

$$C^*(\theta) = \begin{cases} -1 & \theta < -1, \\ \theta & -1 \le \theta \le 1, \\ 1 & \theta > 1, \end{cases}$$

and the corresponding value function is

$$f^*(\theta) = \begin{cases} -(\theta+1)^2 & \theta < -1, \\ 0 & -1 \le \theta \le 1, \\ -(\theta-1)^2 & \theta > 1. \end{cases}$$

As the maximum theorem guarantees, $f^*$ is a continuous function of $\theta$, and the maximizer correspondence $C^*$ is upper hemicontinuous with nonempty, compact values. Because $f$ is strictly concave in $x$, the maximizer is in fact single-valued, so $C^*$ is a continuous function.

=== Utility maximization problem ===
Consider a utility maximization problem where a consumer makes a choice from their budget set. Translating from the notation above to the standard consumer theory notation,

- $X=\mathbb{R}_+^l$ is the space of all bundles of $l$ commodities,
- $\Theta=\mathbb{R}_{++}^l \times \mathbb{R}_{++}$ represents the price vector of the commodities $p$ and the consumer's wealth $w$,
- $f(x,\theta)=u(x)$ is the consumer's utility function, and
- $C(\theta)=B(p,w)=\{x \,|\, px \leq w\}$ is the consumer's budget set.

Then,

- $f^*(\theta)=v(p,w)$ is the indirect utility function and
- $C^*(\theta)=x(p,w)$ is the Marshallian demand.

Proofs in general equilibrium theory often apply the Brouwer or Kakutani fixed-point theorems to the consumer's demand, which require compactness and continuity, and the maximum theorem provides the sufficient conditions to do so.

== See also ==
- Envelope theorem
- Brouwer fixed point theorem
- Kakutani fixed point theorem for correspondences
- Michael selection theorem
