= Fuzzy differential equation =

Fuzzy differential equation are general concept of ordinary differential equation in mathematics defined as differential inclusion for non-uniform upper hemicontinuity convex set with compactness in fuzzy set.
$$dx(t)/dt= F(t,x(t),\alpha),$$
for all $\alpha \in [0,1]$.

== First order fuzzy differential equation ==
A first order fuzzy differential equation with real constant or variable coefficients

$$x'(t) + p(t) x(t) = f(t)$$

where $p(t)$ is a real continuous function and $f(t) \colon [t_0 , \infty) \rightarrow R_F$ is a fuzzy continuous function
$$y(t_0) = y_0$$
such that $y_0 \in R_F$.

== Linear systems of fuzzy differential equations ==
A system of equations of the form

$$x(t)'_n = a_n1(t) x_1(t) + ......+ a_nn(t) x_n(t) + f_n(t)$$
where $a_ij$ are real functions and $f_i$ are fuzzy functions
$$x'_n(t)= \sum_{i=0}^1 a_{ij} x_i.$$

== Fuzzy partial differential equations ==
A fuzzy differential equation with partial differential operator is
$$\nabla x(t) = F(t,x(t),\alpha),$$
for all $\alpha \in [0,1]$.

== Fuzzy fractional differential equation ==
A fuzzy differential equation with fractional differential operator is

$$\frac {d^n x(t)} {dt^n}= F(t,x(t),\alpha),$$
for all $\alpha \in [0,1]$ where $n$ is a rational number.
