= Michael's theorem =

In mathematics, Michael's theorem. after Ernest Michael, can mean:

- Michael's theorem on paracompact spaces saying that a regular space in which each open cover has a refinement by a countable union of locally finite sets of open subsets (not necessarily covering) is paracompact.
- Michael selection theorem.
