= Selection theorem =

Mathematical method

In functional analysis, a branch of mathematics, a selection theorem is a theorem that guarantees the existence of a single-valued selection function from a given set-valued map. There are various selection theorems, and they are important in the theories of differential inclusions, optimal control, and mathematical economics.

== Preliminaries ==
Given two sets X and Y, let F be a set-valued function from X and Y. Equivalently, $F:X\rightarrow\mathcal{P}(Y)$ is a function from X to the power set of Y.

A function $f: X \rightarrow Y$ is said to be a selection of F if

$$\forall x \in X: \,\,\,  f(x) \in F(x) \,.$$

In other words, given an input x for which the original function F returns multiple values, the new function f returns a single value. This is a special case of a choice function.

The axiom of choice implies that a selection function always exists; however, it is often important that the selection have some "nice" properties, such as continuity or measurability. This is where the selection theorems come into action: they guarantee that, if F satisfies certain properties, then it has a selection f that is continuous or has other desirable properties.

== Selection theorems for set-valued functions ==
The Michael selection theorem says that the following conditions are sufficient for the existence of a continuous selection:

- X is a paracompact space;
- Y is a Banach space;
- F is lower hemicontinuous;
- for all x in X, the set F(x) is nonempty, convex and closed.

The approximate selection theorem states the following:

Suppose X is a compact metric space, Y a non-empty compact, convex subset of a normed vector space, and Φ: X → $\mathcal P(Y)$ a multifunction all of whose values are compact and convex. If graph(Φ) is closed, then for every ε > 0 there exists a continuous function f : X → Y with graph(f) ⊂ [graph(Φ)]_{ε}.

Here, $[S]_\varepsilon$ denotes the $\varepsilon$-dilation of $S$, that is, the union of radius-$\varepsilon$ open balls centered on points in $S$. The theorem implies the existence of a continuous approximate selection.

Another set of sufficient conditions for the existence of a continuous approximate selection is given by the Deutsch–Kenderov theorem, whose conditions are more general than those of Michael's theorem (and thus the selection is only approximate):

- X is a paracompact space;
- Y is a normed vector space;
- F is almost lower hemicontinuous, that is, at each $x \in X$, for each neighborhood $V$ of $0$ there exists a neighborhood $U$ of $x$ such that $\bigcap_{u \in U} \{F(u)+V\} \ne \emptyset$;
- for all x in X, the set F(x) is nonempty and convex.

In a later note, Xu proved that the Deutsch–Kenderov theorem is also valid if $Y$ is a locally convex topological vector space.

The Yannelis-Prabhakar selection theorem says that the following conditions are sufficient for the existence of a continuous selection:

- X is a paracompact Hausdorff space;
- Y is a linear topological space;
- for all x in X, the set F(x) is nonempty and convex;
- for all y in Y, the inverse set F^{−1}(y) is an open set in X.

The Kuratowski and Ryll-Nardzewski measurable selection theorem says that if X is a Polish space and $\mathcal B$ its Borel σ-algebra, $\mathrm{Cl}(X)$ is the set of nonempty closed subsets of X, $(\Omega, \mathcal F)$ is a measurable space, and $F : \Omega \to \mathrm{Cl}(X)$ is an $\mathcal F$-weakly measurable map (that is, for every open subset $U \subseteq X$ we have $\{\omega \in \Omega : F(\omega) \cap U \neq \empty \} \in \mathcal F$), then $F$ has a selection that is $(\mathcal F, \mathcal B)$-measurable.

Other selection theorems for set-valued functions include:

- Bressan–Colombo directionally continuous selection theorem
- Castaing representation theorem
- Fryszkowski decomposable map selection
- Helly's selection theorem
- Zero-dimensional Michael selection theorem
- Robert Aumann measurable selection theorem

== Selection theorems for set-valued sequences ==
- Blaschke selection theorem
- Maximum theorem
