= Kuratowski and Ryll-Nardzewski measurable selection theorem =

In mathematics, the Kuratowski–Ryll-Nardzewski measurable selection theorem is a result from measure theory that gives a sufficient condition for a set-valued function to have a measurable selection function. It is named after the Polish mathematicians Kazimierz Kuratowski and Czesław Ryll-Nardzewski.

Many classical selection results follow from this theorem and it is widely used in mathematical economics and optimal control.

== Statement of the theorem ==
Let $X$ be a Polish space, $\mathcal{B} (X)$ the Borel σ-algebra of $X$, $(\Omega, \mathcal{F})$ a measurable space and $\psi$ a multifunction on $\Omega$ taking values in the set of nonempty closed subsets of $X$.

Suppose that $\psi$ is $\mathcal{F}$-weakly measurable, that is, for every open subset $U$ of $X$, we have

$$\{\omega : \psi (\omega) \cap U \neq \empty \} \in \mathcal{F}.$$

Then $\psi$ has a selection that is $\mathcal{F}$-$\mathcal{B} (X)$-measurable.

== See also ==
- Selection theorem
