= Kakutani =

Kakutani is a Japanese surname. Notable people with the surname include:

- Michiko Kakutani (born 1955), Japanese-American Pulitzer Prize-winning critic
- Shizuo Kakutani (1911–2004), Japanese-American mathematician
  - Kakutani fixed-point theorem
