= Fuzzy differential inclusion =

Fuzzy differential inclusion is the extension of differential inclusion to fuzzy sets introduced by Lotfi A. Zadeh.

$x'(t) \in [ f(t , x(t))]^\alpha$ with $x(0) \in [x_0]^\alpha$

Suppose $f(t,x(t))$ is a fuzzy valued continuous function on Euclidean space. Then it is the collection of all normal, upper semi-continuous, convex, compactly supported fuzzy subsets of $\mathbb{R}^n$.

== Second order differential ==
The second order differential is

$x''(t) \in [kx]^ \alpha$ where $k \in [K]^ \alpha$, $K$ is trapezoidal fuzzy number $(-1,-1/2,0,1/2)$, and $x_0$ is a trianglular fuzzy number (-1,0,1).

== Applications ==
Fuzzy differential inclusion (FDI) has applications in

- Cybernetics
- Artificial intelligence, Neural network,
- Medical imaging
- Robotics
- Atmospheric dispersion modeling
- Weather forecasting
- Cyclone
- Pattern recognition
- Population biology
