= Gabriele Eichfelder =

German applied mathematician

Gabriele Eichfelder (born 1977) is a German applied mathematician whose research focuses on mathematical optimization with vector-valued functions and set-valued functions. She is a professor at the Technische Universität Ilmenau, where she is head of the Group for Mathematical Methods in Operations Research.

== Education and career ==
After secondary school in Bamberg, Eichfelder received a diploma in mathematics, with a minor in economics, at the University of Erlangen–Nuremberg in 2001. She continued at the University of Erlangen–Nuremberg for a 2006 doctorate in applied mathematics, and a 2012 habilitation. Her doctoral advisors were Johannes Jahn and Jörg Fliege.

She was an assistant professor at the University of Erlangen–Nuremberg from 2006 to 2012, and has been a full professor at the Technische Universität Ilmenau since 2012.

== Books ==
Eichfelder is the author of the books Adaptive Scalarization Methods in Multiobjective Optimization (Springer, 2008) and Variable Ordering Structures in Vector Optimization (Springer, 2014).

== Recognition ==
The Association of European Operational Research Societies (EURO) Working Group on Continuous Optimization (EUROPT) named Eichfelder as its 2024 EUROPT Fellow.
