= Aleksei Filippov (mathematician) =

Russian mathematician (1923–2006)

Aleksei F. Filippov
- Born: 29 September 1923; Moscow, Soviet Union
- Died: 10 October 2006 (aged 83); Moscow, Russia
- Education: Moscow State University
- Known for: Filippov's lemma Curve theorem proof
- Scientific career
- Fields: Mathematics
- Workplaces: Moscow State University
- Doctoral advisor: Ivan G. Petrovsky

Aleksei Fedorovich Filippov (Russian: Алексей Фёдорович Филиппов; 29 September 1923 – 10 October 2006) was a Russian mathematician who worked on differential equations, differential inclusions, diffraction theory and numerical methods.

Born in Moscow in 1923, Filippov served in the Red Army during the Second World War, then attended Moscow State University (Faculty of Mechanics and Mathematics). After graduating in 1950, he remained to work at the school. He got his Ph.D. under the supervision of I. G. Petrovsky, and became a professor in 1978. He taught until his death in 2006.

Filippov showed interest in continuous loops in 1950 when he constructed a proof that they divide a plane into interior and exterior parts. Known as the Jordan curve theorem, it exemplifies a mathematical proposition easily stated but difficult to prove.

In 1955 Filippov and V. S. Ryaben'kii became interested in difference equations and wrote On the Stability of Difference Equations. The work was developed into a textbook in 1961 which was used in Moscow State University and many other Russian universities for several decades. In 1959 he published a paper containing a lemma about implicit functions designed for use in optimal control theory that is named after him (Filippov's lemma).

Filippov made an important contribution in the theory of discontinuous ordinary differential equations with his monograph Differential Equations with Discontinuous Righthand Sides (1985). Such set-valued dynamical systems arise in sliding mode control, an important class of feedback control systems demonstrating robust control. Such systems model some mechanical systems with Coulomb friction, and more recently genetic networks.

A. F. Filippov was awarded the Moscow State University's Lomonosov Award in 1993.
