= André Berge =

French physician and psychoanalyst

André Berge (24 May 1902 – 27 October 1995) was a French physician and psychoanalyst. He was born on 24 May 1902 in the 16th Arrondissement of Paris and died on the 27 October 1995 in Paris and he was a doctor, psychoanalyst and 'Man of Letters'.

== Biography ==
He was the son of René Berge, a civil mining engineer and Antoinette Faure, and grandson of Félix Faure.

In 1924, he married Geneviève Fourcade. They were the parents of Claude Berge (1926–2002) the mathematician.

He was one of the founders of the 'l'École des parents et éducateurs' in 1930 in Paris, of which he remained Vice President virtually until the end of his life. He was also medical director of the Claude Bernard 'Centre psychopédagogique' (Psycho-pedagogical Centre) of the Paris Academy from 1946 to 1973 and he was lecturer at the Institute of Psychology at the Sorbonne from 1961 to 1971. In 1965 he founded the 'Association for the Rehabilitation of the Mentally Infirm' (APRIM). He was the founder with his brother, François Berge, of the journal 'Les Cahiers du mois' in 1924. He is the author of several novels (L'Amitié indiscrète, Kra, 1927; Les Ailes d'Icare, Cahiers du Sud, 1928), a book of tales for children (Séraphine ou les Ficelles de Paquet-de-nerfs, Flammarion, 1954), philosophical essays (Les Maladies de la vertu, Grasset, 1960) and various studies (Les Psycho-thérapies, PUF, 1968). However, André Berge published mainly numerous articles and books devoted to the Psychology of childhood, psycho-pedagogy and sexuality in childhood and their effects on the problems in the family (L'Éducation sexuelle chez l'enfant, PUF,1952; Comprendre et éduquer un enfant difficile, Hachette, 1973). These have secured him a great reputation in this area.

He died in 1995 and is buried alongside his wife in the small cemetery of Saint-Maurice-d'Ételan.

== Bibliography of works ==
- Le Crépuscule de M. Dargent, Les Presses Universitaires, 1924.
- L'Amitié indiscrète, Sagitaire, 1927.
- Les Ailes d'Icare, Cahiers du Sud, 1928.
- Bernard Bardeau : La Nebuleuse, Plon, 1929.
- L'Esprit de la littérature moderne, 1930.
- Le Visiteur nocturne, Le Masque a collection of his articles no. 127, Librairie des Champs-Élysées, 1933.
- Discours au nouveau-né, 1946.
- Le Facteur psychique dans l'énurésie, 1946.
- L'Éducation sexuelle et affective, 1948.
- Pour-contre l'éducation nouvelle, Berger-1951.
- L'Écolier difficile : l'école et les défauts de l'enfant, éditions Bourrelier, Carnets de pédagogie pratique', 1954.
- Le Métier de parent : Du mariage des parents au marriage des enfants, Aubier, 1956.
- Les Défauts des parents, Société universitaire d'éditions et de librairie Alençon, Impr. alençonnaise, 1960.
- Les Maladies de la vertu. La Morale pour ou contre l'homme ?, B. Grasset, 1960.
- Propos aux parents et aux éducateurs, éditions Montaigne, 1961.
- Liberté dans l'éducation, Scarabée Ézanville, impr. G. Gouin, 1961.
- Contre la peur de vivre et de l'angoisse de mourir, B. Grasset Ligugé, impr. Aubin, 1963.
- Séraphine, ou les Ficelles de Paquet-de-Nerfs, 1963.
- Les Psychothérapies, PUF, collection Le psychologue, 1968.
- L'Éducation sexuelle chez l'enfant, SUP - Paideia PUF, 1968.
- Les Défauts de l'enfant, Payot, 1968.
- Petit Lexique parents-enfants, Magnard, 1969.
- La Sexualité aujourd'hui, Casterman, 1970.
- Réminiscences : souvenirs de ma première vie, Émile-Paul, 1975.
- Comprendre et éduquer un enfant difficile, Payot, 1977 ISBN 2228331805.
- L'Esprit de la littérature moderne, Perrin.
- Éducation familiale (l'Enfant et l'Avenir), Aubier-Montaigne.
- La Sexualité aujourd'hui. Vie affective et sexuelle, Casterman.
- Petit Lexique parents-enfants, éditions Magnard, L'École des Parents.
- Les Psychothérapies, SUP - Le psychologue, PUF.
- Pour ou contre l'éducation nouvelle, Pour ou Contre, Berger-Levrault éditions.
- L'Acte gratuit, Arcane 17, 1985.
- De l'écriture à la psychanalyse, Clancier-Guénaud, 1988 ISBN 2862151300.
- Métier de parent, Aubier, 1992 ISBN 9782700720303.
- Aujourd'hui l'enfant, Aubier Montaigne, 1992 ISBN 9782700700343.
- André Berge : écrivain, psychanalyste, éducateur, Desclée de Brouwer, 1995 ISBN 2220036928.
