= Michel Las Vergnas =

French mathematician

- Born: 11 January 1941; Neuilly-sur-Seine, France
- Died: 19 January 2013 (aged 72); Hauts-de-Seine, France
- Education: École Normale Supérieure; Pierre-and-Marie-Curie University
- Known for: Oriented matroids; Las Vergnas polynomial; Active bijection
- Awards: CNRS Silver Medal (1986)
- Scientific career
- Fields: Combinatorics; Graph theory; Matroid theory
- Workplaces: Centre national de la recherche scientifique; Pierre-and-Marie-Curie University
- Thesis: Problèmes de couplages et problèmes hamiltoniens en théorie des graphes (1972)
- Doctoral advisor: Claude Berge
- Doctoral students: François Bry

Michel Las Vergnas (11 January 1941 – 19 January 2013) was a French mathematician associated with Pierre-and-Marie-Curie University in Paris, and a research director emeritus at the Centre national de la recherche scientifique.

Las Vergnas earned his Ph.D. in 1972 from Pierre-and-Marie-Curie University, under the supervision of Claude Berge. He was one of the founders of the European Journal of Combinatorics, which began publishing in 1980.

A workshop on combinatorial geometry, held in Marseille in April 2013, was dedicated to his memory.

== Research ==
Las Vergnas's early work was in graph theory, on matchings and connectivity. From 1975 he was one of the pioneers of the theory of oriented matroids, and with Robert G. Bland he wrote one of its founding papers; his later work concerned connections between combinatorics and geometry. In matroid theory he introduced the Tutte polynomial of a morphism of matroids, studied in a series of papers from the 1970s to 2013; its specialisation to graphs embedded in surfaces is known as the Las Vergnas polynomial. He also showed that matroids in general admit no tensor product.

== Conjectures ==
Several conjectures carry his name. The simplex conjecture, posed in 1980, states that every simple oriented matroid has a simplicial tope; it is known to hold for realizable oriented matroids and in rank three.

The Cordovil–Las Vergnas conjecture, recorded by Roudneff and Sturmfels in 1988, states that any two uniform oriented matroids of the same rank on the same ground set are connected by a sequence of mutations; Roudneff and Sturmfels proved it for realizable oriented matroids.
