= Miroslav Katětov =

Czech mathematician, chess master, and psychologist

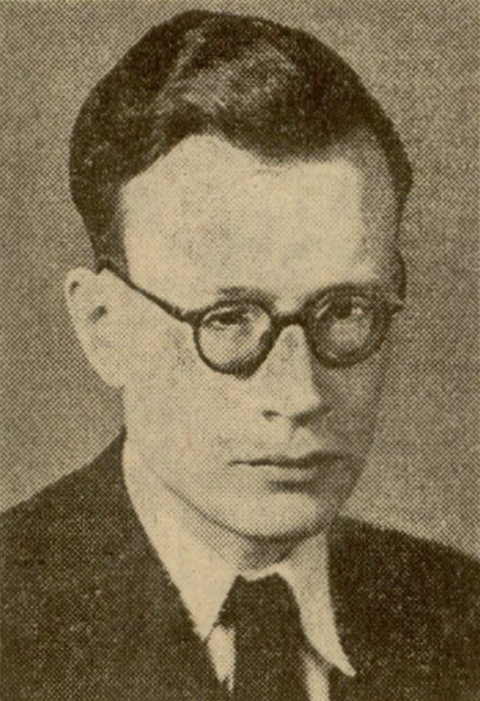
Miroslav Katětov, c. 1953

Miroslav Katětov (Czech pronunciation: [ˈmɪroslaf ˈkacɛtof]; March 17, 1918, Chembar, Russia – December 15, 1995) was a Czech mathematician, chess master, and psychologist. His research interests in mathematics included topology and functional analysis. He was an author of the Katětov–Tong insertion theorem. From 1953 to 1957 he was rector of Charles University in Prague.
