= Berge equilibrium =

Solution concept capturing altruism in game theory

The Berge equilibrium is a game theory solution concept named after the mathematician Claude Berge. It is similar to the standard Nash equilibrium, except that it aims to capture a type of altruism rather than purely non-cooperative play. Whereas a Nash equilibrium is a situation in which each player of a strategic game ensures that they personally will receive the highest payoff given other players' strategies, in a Berge equilibrium every player ensures that all other players will receive the highest payoff possible. Although Berge introduced the intuition for this equilibrium notion in 1957, it was only formally defined by Vladislav Iosifovich Zhukovskii in 1985, and it was not in widespread use until half a century after Berge originally developed it.

== History ==
The Berge equilibrium was first introduced in Claude Berge's 1957 book Théorie générale des jeux à n personnes. Moussa Larbani and Vladislav Iosifovich Zhukovskii write that the ideas in this book were not widely used in Russia partly due to a harsh review that it received shortly after its translation into Russian in 1961, and they were not used in the English speaking world because the book had only received French and Russian printings. These explanations are echoed by other authors, with Pierre Courtois et al. adding that the impact of the book was likely dampened by its lack of economic examples, as well as by its reliance on tools from graph theory that would have been less familiar to economists of the time.

Berge introduced his original equilibrium notion only in intuitive terms, and the first formal definition of the Berge equilibrium was published by Vladislav Iosifovich Zhukovskii in 1985. The topic of Berge equilibria was then studied in detail by Konstantin Semenovich Vaisman in his 1995 PhD dissertation, and Larbani and Zhukovskii document that the tool became more widely used in the mid-2000s as economists became interested in increasingly complex systems in which players might be more inclined to seek globally favourable equilibria and attach value to other players' payoffs. Colman et al. connect interest in the Berge equilibrium to interest in cooperative game theory, the evolution of cooperation, and topics like altruism in evolutionary game theory.

== Definition ==
=== Formal definition ===
Consider a normal-form game $G = \langle N, S_i, u_i \rangle$, where $N = \{1, 2, \ldots, n\}$ is the set of $n$ players, $S_i$ is the (nonempty) strategy set of player $i$ where $i \in N$, and $u_i$ is that player's utility function. Denote a strategy profile as $s = (s_1, s_2, \ldots, s_n) \in S$, and denote an incomplete strategy profile $s_{-i} = (s_1, s_2, \ldots, s_{i-1}, s_{i+1}, \ldots, s_n)$. A strategy profile $s^\ast \in S$ is called a Berge equilibrium if, for any player $i \in N$ and any $s_{-i} \in S_{-i}$, the strategy profile satisfies $u_i(s^\ast_i,s_{-i}) \leq u_i(s^\ast)$.

=== Informal definition ===
The players in a game are playing a Berge equilibrium if they have chosen a strategy profile such that, if any given player $i$ sticks with their chosen strategy while some of the other players change their strategies, then player $i$'s payoff will not increase. So, every player in a Berge equilibrium guarantees the best possible payoff for every other player who is playing their Berge equilibrium strategy; this is a contrast with Nash equilibria, in which each player $i$ is only concerned about maximizing their own payoffs from their strategy, and no other player cares about the payoff obtained by player $i$.

== Example ==
Consider the following prisoner's dilemma game, from Larbani and Zhukovskii (2017):

Red Blue	Cooperate	Defect
Cooperate	20 20	25 5
Defect	5 25	10 10

=== Berge result ===
A Berge equilibrium of this game is the situation in which both players pick "cooperate", denote it $(C,C)$. This is a Berge equilibrium because each player can only lower the other player's payoff by switching their strategy; if either player switched from "cooperate" to "defect", then they would lower the other player's payoff from 20 down to 5, so they must be in a Berge equilibrium.

=== Berge versus Nash result ===
Notice first that the Berge equilibrium $(C,C)$ is not a Nash equilibrium, because either the row player or the column player could increase their own payoff from 20 to 25 by switching to "defect" instead of "cooperate".

A Nash equilibrium of this prisoner's dilemma game is the situation in which both players pick "defect", denote it $(D,D)$. That strategy pair yields a payoff of 10 to the row player and 10 to the column player, and no player has a unilateral incentive to switch their strategy to maximize their own payoff. However, $(D,D)$ is not a Berge equilibrium, because the row player could ensure a higher payoff for the column player by switching strategies and giving the column player a payoff of 25 instead of 10, and the column player could do the same for the row player.

The cooperative nature of the Berge equilibrium therefore avoids the mutual defection problem that has made the prisoner's dilemma a notorious example of the potential for Nash equilibrium reasoning to produce a mutually suboptimal result.

== Motivation ==
The Berge equilibrium has been motivated as the exact opposite of a Nash equilibrium, in that while the Nash equilibrium models selfish behaviours, the Berge equilibrium models altruistic behaviours. Moussa Larbani and Vladislav Iosifovich Zhukovskii note that Berge equilibria could be interpreted as a method for formalising the Golden Rule in strategic interactions.

One advantage of the Berge equilibrium over the Nash equilibrium is that the Berge results may agree more closely with results obtained from experimental psychology and experimental economics. Several authors have noted that players asked to play games like the Prisoner's Dilemma or the ultimatum game in laboratory scenarios rarely reach the Nash Equilibrium result, in part because people in real situations often do attach value to the well-being of others, and that therefore Berge equilibria could sometimes be a better fit to real behaviour in certain situations.

A challenge for the use of Berge equilibria is that they do not have as strong existence properties as Nash equilibria, although their existence may be assured by adding extra conditions. The Berge equilibrium solution concept may also be used for games that do not satisfy the conditions for Nash's existence theorem and have no Nash equilibria, such as certain games with infinite strategy sets, or in situations where equilibria in pure strategies are desired and yet there are no Nash equilibria among the pure strategy profiles.
