= Antoine Magnan =

- Born: 13 June 1881; Paris, France
- Died: 5 March 1938 (aged 56)
- Known for: Suggesting insect flight was impossible
- Scientific career
- Fields: Zoology, Aeronautics
- Institutions: Collège de France; Ecole pratique des Hautes Etudes

Antoine Magnan (French pronunciation: [ɑ̃twan maɲɑ̃]; 13 June 1881 – 5 March 1938) was a French zoologist and aeronautical engineer who studied the flight of insects and birds for possible lessons to apply to powered flight. He is best known for a remark in his 1934 book Le Vol des Insectes ("Insect Flight") that insect flight seemed impossible.

== Life and work ==
Magnan was born in the central 7th arrondissement of Paris on 13 June 1881. He qualified as a doctor of medicine and of science, and received the diploma of superior studies in zoology. He became a professor of animal mechanics applied to aviation at the Collège de France (from 1929 to 1938), and the director of the experimental morphology laboratory and the aviation laboratory at the École pratique des hautes études in Paris. He was responsible to the ministries of Education, Agriculture and the Interior.

=== Insect flight ===
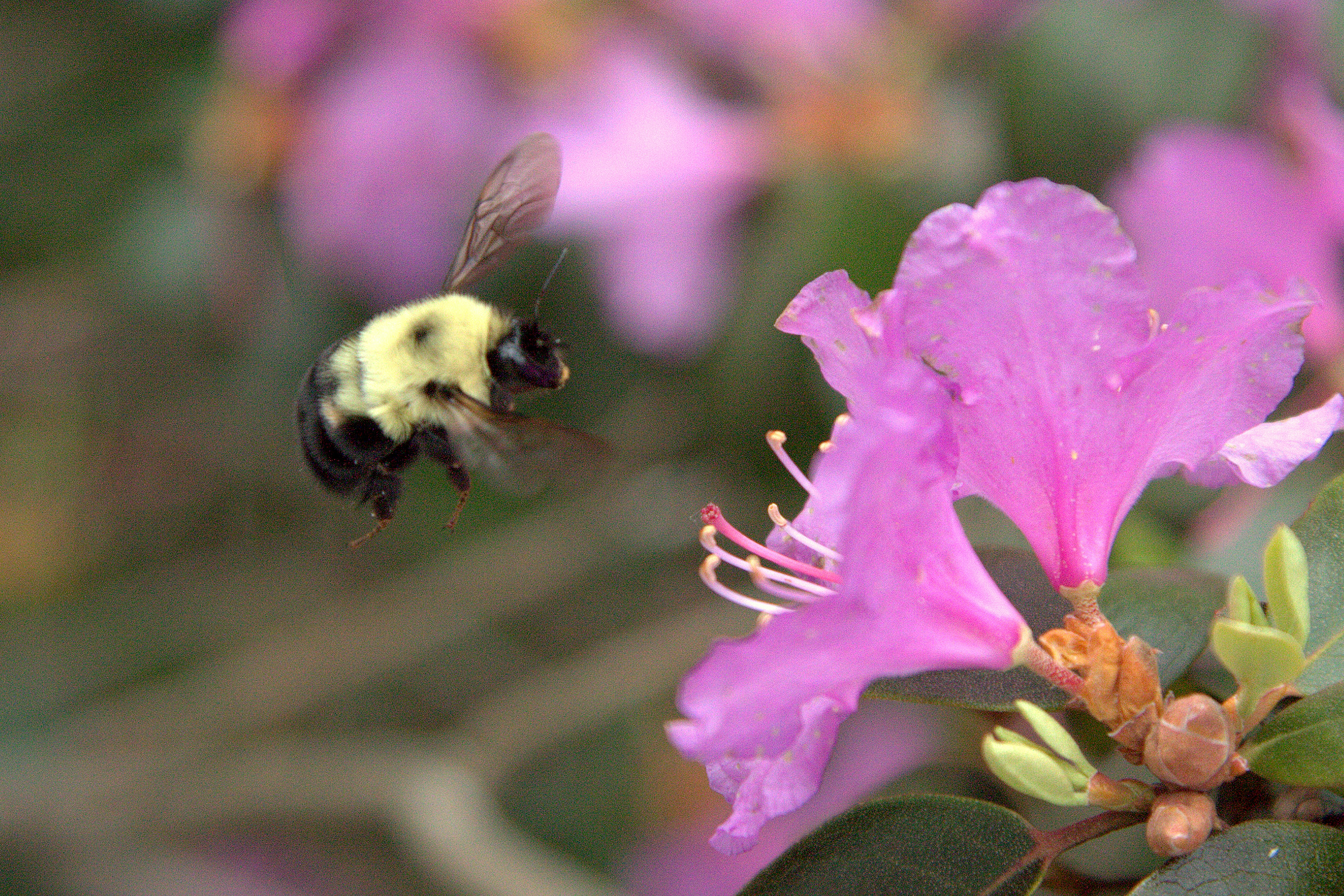
Bumblebee in flight, although Magnan's 1934 Le Vol des Insectes stated that this seemed impossible

The following passage appears in the introduction to Le Vol des Insectes:

Tout d'abord poussé par ce qui se fait en aviation, j'ai appliqué aux insectes les lois de la résistance de l'air, et je suis arrivé avec M. Sainte-Laguë à cette conclusion que leur vol est impossible.

This translates to:

First prompted by what is done in aviation, I applied the laws of air resistance to insects, and I arrived, with Mr. Sainte-Laguë, at this conclusion that their flight is impossible.

Magnan refers to his assistant, the mathematician and engineer André Sainte-Laguë as the source of the calculations mentioned.

However, soon after the above passage Magnan continues:

Or, il y a un fait, c'est que l'insecte vole et qu'il sustente son poids à chaque instant. Il n'y a pas lieu toutefois de s'étonner de ce que les résultats fournis par le calcul ne soient pas en accord avec la réalité. La discordance tient à ce que, à l'heure actuelle, nous ne savons pas quelles sont les qualités aérodynamiques d'une aile d'insecte, à bord antérieur épais et rigide, à bord postérieur souple et mince, sorte de plan constitué souvent par des rigoles dont on ne connaît pas encore très bien le rôle, malgré les expériences que j'ai effectuées à ce sujet.

This translates to:

Still, the fact remains that the insect flies and supports its weight at every moment. There is therefore no reason to be surprised that the results provided by calculation do not agree with reality. The discrepancy arises from the fact that, at present, we do not know what the aerodynamic properties of an insect wing are—one with a thick and rigid leading edge and a flexible, thin trailing edge, a kind of surface often formed by grooves whose role is still not well understood, despite the experiments I have carried out on this subject.

== Works ==
- Le tube digestif et le Régime alimentaire des Oiseaux. Hermann, 1911.
- Le Poids des tectrices chez les oiseaux carinatés. Imprimerie Nationale, 1912.
- Les caractéristiques des oiseaux suivant le mode de vol: leur application a la construction des avions. Masson, 1922.
- Le vol des oiseaux: directives que l'on peut en tirer pour l'aviation. G. Roche D'Estrez, 1922.
- Pour voler à voile: études expérimentales sur le vol à voile des oiseaux avec l'application à l'aviation (extraits de L'air). G. Roche D'Estrez, 1923.
- "L'Énergie interne du vent et le vol à voile". Revue generale des sciences pures et appliquees, 28 Feb 1925, v.36, pp. 101–11.
- L'Accélérographe H.M.P.: Son application à la mesure des accélérations en vol. With E. Huguenard and A. Planiol. 1926
- Essai de Théorie Du Poisson. With André Sainte-Laguë. Services Techniques de l'Aéronautique, 1929.
- Les caractéristiques géométriques et physiques des poissons avec contribution à l'étude de leur équilibre statique et dynamique, Volumes 1-2. Masson, 1929.
- Hodographes et polaires d'avions, 1930.
- Étude des trajectoires et des qualités aérodynamiques d'un avion par l'emploi d'un appareil cinématographique de bord. With André Sainte-Laguë. E. Blondel La Rougery, 1932.
- "Sur le poids relatif des muscles moteurs des ailes chez les insectes." With C. Perrilliat-Botonet. C. R. Acad. Sci. v.195, pp. 559–561.
- Cinématographie jusqu'à 12000 vues par seconde avec application à l'étude du vol des insectes. Hermann, 1932.
- Sur l'excédant de puissance des oiseaux. Hermann, 1933.
- Le Vol des Insectes ("Insect Flight"). Volume 1 of Locomotion chez les animaux ("Locomotion in Animals"), Hermann, 1934.
