= André Sainte-Laguë =

French mathematician (1882–1950)

- Born: 20 April 1882; Saint-Martin-Curton, Lot-et-Garonne, France
- Died: 18 January 1950 (aged 67)
- Known for: The Sainte-Laguë method for seat allocation
- Scientific career
- Fields: Graph theory, aeronautics, mathematics

André Sainte-Laguë (French pronunciation: [ɑ̃dʁe sɛ̃t laɡy], 20 April 1882, Saint-Martin-Curton – 18 January 1950) was a French mathematician who was a pioneer in the area of graph theory. His research on seat allocation methods (published in 1910) led to one being named after him, the Sainte-Laguë method. Also named after him is the Sainte-Laguë Index for measuring the proportionality of an electoral outcome.

He is also notable for his informal calculation that supposedly demonstrated that a bumblebee could not fly, referred to in the introduction of 'Le Vol des Insectes' (Hermann and Cle, Paris, 1934) by the entomologist Antoine Magnan. This casual calculation was based on a comparison between an aeroplane and a bee, making the wrong assumption that bees' wings were smooth and flat. He, and others, soon corrected this assumption, but the story of the scientist who demonstrated that bee flight was impossible persists to this day.

He published several popular math texts, including "From the known to the unknown" (foreword by biologist Jean Rostand) which has been translated into several languages.

== Biography ==
Born in Casteljaloux (Lot-et-Garonne) in 1882, Sainte-Laguë was admitted at once, at the age of 20 years at the Ecole Polytechnique and Ecole Normale Superieure. He chose the latter and became a professor in the provinces, then in Paris. During World War I, having been wounded three times, he was attached to the Department of Inventions of the Normal School from 1917 to 1919, studied long-range artillery shells, and thereafter, the flight of birds and matters relating to aviation (theory test fish).

After the First World War, as a professor in the schools of Paris, he became a lecturer in mathematics at the Conservatoire National des Arts et Metiers, and in 1938 received the Chair of Applied Mathematics, training generations of engineers and technicians. Sainte-Laguë was the organizer and host of the Mathematics Section of the Palais de la Découverte (Palace of Discovery) and its famous "Pi Room", where his encyclopedic mind is still present.

Besides his academic career, he led a life of an activist, especially the Confederation of Intellectual Workers, of which he was president in 1929. From the earliest days of the occupation, he took an important part in the resistance and was even imprisoned for a while. He resumed his duties at the Conservatoire National des Arts et Metiers after the Liberation and had a growing number of students. At his death he was teaching three courses totaling two thousand five hundred students.

Officer of the Legion of Honour, Croix de Guerre and Medal of the Resistance, a professor at the School of Special Public Works, chairman of the International Confederation Intellectual of Workers, Vice-President of the Confederation of the Middle Class, former president of the Society of Fellows, former vice-president of National Economic Council, former member of the General Council of the Banque de France, former Deputy Provisional Consultative Assembly.(...)

His sudden death came at the very moment he had just accepted the chairmanship of the Committee of the League of Friends of the Psychic Institute, where he was vice president in 1949 and member since 1934. "(R. Warcollier, Vice- President of IMI, January–February–March 1950)

== Works ==
- Notions de mathématiques. Paris: Hermann. 1913.
- Les Réseaux. Toulouse: Privat. 1924.
- Géométrie plane: livres I et II. Paris: Carus. 1924.
- Géométrie plane: livres III et IV. Paris: École universelle. 1925.
- Les Réseaux (ou graphes). Mémorial des sciences mathématiques. Paris: Gauthier-Villars. 1926.
- Géométrie de situation et jeux. Mémorial des sciences mathématiques. Paris: Gauthier-Villars. 1929.
- André de Sainte-Laguë; Antoine Magnan (1932). Étude des trajectoires et des qualités aérodynamiques d'un avion par l'emploi d'un appareil cinématographique de bord. Publications scientifiques et techniques du Ministère de l'Air. Service des recherches de l'aéronautique. Paris: Gauthier-Villars.
- Probabilités et morphologie. Actualités scientifiques et industrielles. Paris: Hermann. 1932.
- André de Sainte-Laguë; Antoine Magnan (1932). Sur la distribution en vol des vitesses aérodynamiques autour d'un avion en vol. Publications scientifiques et techniques du Ministère de l'Air. Service des recherches de l'aéronautique. Paris: Gauthier-Villars.
- Guy Iliovici; André de Sainte-Laguë (1933). Cours d'algèbre et d'analyse, à l'usage des élèves des classes de mathématiques spéciales et des candidats aux grandes écoles. Paris: L. Eyrolles.
- Guy Iliovici; André de Sainte-Laguë (1933). Mathématiques appliquées à l'usage des ingénieurs, des élèves-ingénieurs et des étudiants des Facultés des sciences. Paris: L. Eyrolles.
- Antoine Magnan; André de Sainte-Laguë (1933). De quelques méthodes en morphologie. Paris: Éd. Masson.
- Antoine Magnan; André de Sainte-Laguë (1933). Le Vol au point fixe. Actualités scientifiques et industrielles. Exposés de morphologie dynamique et de mécanique du mouvement. Paris: Hermann.
- La Règle à calcul: introduction, historique, fabrication, choix d'une règle, mode d'emploi. Bibliothèque de l'enseignement scientifique. Paris: L. Eyrolles. 1934.
- Avec des nombres et des lignes: récréations mathématiques. Paris: Vuibert. 1937.
- André Sainte-Laguë (1941). Du connu à l'inconnu. L'Avenir de la science. Paris: Gallimard.
- Algèbre, analyse et géométrie analytique. Bibliothèque de l'Institut de topométrie. Paris: Eyrolles. 1947.
- Andre Bourrée; André de Sainte-Laguë (1948). Algèbre. Les Collèges techniques. Paris: Foucher.
- Géométrie descriptive et géométrie cotée: à l'usage des élèves de la classe de mathématiques et des candidats aux écoles. Les Mathématiques de l'ingénieur. Paris: Eyrolles. 1948.
- Le Monde des formes. Savoir. Paris: A. Fayard. 1948.
- André Sainte-Laguë; Henri Masson (1949). L'Utilisation pratique des mathématiques, vol. 1, Calculs numériques et graphiques. Les Mathématiques de l'ingénieur. Paris: Eyrolles.
- André Sainte-Laguë (1953). De l'homme au robot. Savoir. Paris: Fayard.

== Honours ==
- National Order of the Legion of Honour
- Croix de guerre 1914-1918
- Resistance Medal
