= Philip Hallie =

American philosopher

Philip Paul Hallie (1922–1994) was an author, philosopher and professor at Wesleyan University for 32 years. During World War II he served in the US Army. His degrees were from Harvard, Oxford (where he was a Fulbright Scholar at Jesus College from 1949 to 1951) and Grinnell College.

He developed the model of institutional cruelty.

== Institutional cruelty ==
Institutional cruelty is a model developed by Philip Hallie, who believes ethics are rooted in passion and common sense rather than in technical science.

Hallie defines "institutional cruelty" as a persistent pattern of humiliation that endures for years in a community, but the victimizer and the victim find ways to downplay the harm that is being done. Both the victim and the victimizer justify cruel actions based on what they have been led to believe is "actual" inferiority. Hallie argues that cruelty is created by an imbalance of power, or hierarchy. According to his view, the opposite of institutionalized cruelty is freedom from the cruel relationship, not just kindness.

Institutional cruelty demotes individuality. Hallie cites a quote from a Nazi SS Officer stating, "Commitment [to an institution] that overrides all sentimentality transforms cruelty and destruction into moral nobility, and commitment is the lifeblood of an institution" (Hallie "From Cruelty to Goodness" 7).

== Published works ==
Hallie's work generally explores the nature of ethics—good and evil, cruelty and kindness. His writing and statements have made particular reference to the admiration he holds for members of the French Resistance at Le Chambon-sur-Lignon.

- Scar of Montaigne (1966)
- The Paradox of Cruelty (1969)
- Lest Innocent Blood be Shed (1979)
- Tales of Good and Evil, Help and Harm (1997)
- In the Eye of the Hurricane: Tales of Good and Evil, Help and Harm (2001)
- From Cruelty to Goodness

In "From Cruelty to Goodness" he defines cruelty by what it depends upon to exist. He explains that all cruelty derives from a deficit in power. Examples are used such as Nazi concentration camps and slavery. "The power of the majority and the weakness of a minority were at the center of institutional cruelty of slavery and Nazi anti-Semitism." He also emphasizes that deep humiliation in institutionalized cruelty can be just as hurtful to the victim as episodic cruelty, cruelty where both the victim and the victimizer are aware of the harm being committed. He then goes on to purport that the redress of stopping cruelty isn't enough to negate or perfectly oppose cruelty. Hospitality is the only cure for cruelty. "It lies in unsentimental, efficacious love." This is described as not only "being your brothers keeper" (protecting the weak), but also as staying true to the "negative injunctions against killing and betraying."

== See also ==
- American philosophy
- List of American philosophers
