= Ernest Michael =

American mathematician

Ernest A. Michael
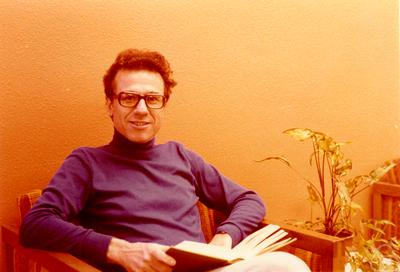
- Ernest Michael
- Born: August 26, 1925; Zürich, Switzerland
- Died: April 29, 2013 (aged 87); Seattle, Washington, US
- Education: University of Chicago; Harvard University
- Scientific career
- Fields: Mathematics
- Doctoral advisor: Irving Segal

Ernest A. Michael (August 26, 1925 – April 29, 2013) was a prominent American mathematician known for his work in the field of general topology, most notably for his pioneering research on set-valued mappings. He is credited with developing the theory of continuous selections. The Michael selection theorem is named for him, which he proved in (Michael 1956). Michael is also known in topology for the Michael line, a paracompact space whose product with the topological space of the irrational numbers is not normal. He wrote over 100 papers, mostly in the area of general topology.

Michael was born in Zürich, Switzerland, August 26, 1925, to Ashkenazi Jewish parents, Jacob and Erna Michael. He lived in Berlin, Germany, until 1932. Anticipating the burgeoning threat of Nazism, his family moved to The Hague, Netherlands, and then to New York in 1939. Michael attended Horace Mann High School, graduating at age 15. His undergraduate career at Cornell University was interrupted when he enlisted in the United States Navy (1944–46), where he served aboard the USS Kwajalein. He returned to Cornell, where he received his B.A. in 1947. He earned his M.A. from Harvard University in 1948, and Ph.D. from The University of Chicago in 1951, writing his dissertation titled Locally Multiplicatively-Convex Topological Algebras under the supervision of Irving Segal.

Michael was a member of the Department of Mathematics at the University of Washington (assistant professor 1952–56, associate professor 1956–60, professor 1960) for over 40 years, from 1952 until his retirement in 1993. He was also a visiting scholar at the Institute for Advanced Study (1951–52, 1956–57, 1960–61, 1968–69), ETH Zurich (1973–74) and University of Stuttgart (1978–79).

In 2012 he became an inaugural fellow of the American Mathematical Society.

Michael died in 2013 at the age of 87.

== Selected works ==
- Michael, Ernest (1956), "Continuous selections. I" (PDF), Annals of Mathematics, Second Series, 63 (2), The Annals of Mathematics, Vol. 63, No. 2: 361–382, doi:10.2307/1969615, JSTOR 1969615, MR 0077107
