= Choice function =

Mathematical function

Let X be a set of sets none of which are empty. Then a choice function (selector, selection) on X is a mathematical function f that is defined on X such that f is a mapping that assigns each element of X to one of its elements.

== An example ==
Let X = { {1,4,7}, {9}, {2,7} }. Then the function f defined by f({1, 4, 7}) = 7, f({9}) = 9 and f({2, 7}) = 2 is a choice function on X.

== History and importance ==
Ernst Zermelo (1904) introduced choice functions as well as the axiom of choice (AC) and proved the well-ordering theorem, which states that every set can be well-ordered. AC states that every set of nonempty sets has a choice function. A weaker form of AC, the axiom of countable choice (AC_{ω}) states that every countable set of nonempty sets has a choice function. However, in the absence of either AC or AC_{ω}, some sets can still be shown to have a choice function.

- If $X$ is a finite set of nonempty sets, then one can construct a choice function for $X$ by picking one element from each member of $X.$ This requires only finitely many choices, so neither AC or AC_{ω} is needed.
- If every member of $X$ is a nonempty set, and the union $\bigcup X$ is well-ordered, then one may choose the least element of each member of $X$. In this case, it was possible to simultaneously well-order every member of $X$ by making just one choice of a well-order of the union, so neither AC nor AC_{ω} was needed. (This example shows that the well-ordering theorem implies AC. The converse is also true, but less trivial.)

== Choice function of a multivalued map ==
Given two sets $X$ and $Y$, let $F$ be a multivalued map from $X$ to $Y$ (equivalently, $F:X\rightarrow\mathcal{P}(Y)$ is a function from $X$ to the power set of $Y$).

A function $f: X \rightarrow Y$ is said to be a selection of $F$, if:

$$\forall x \in X \, ( f(x) \in F(x) ) \,.$$

The existence of more regular choice functions, namely continuous or measurable selections is important in the theory of differential inclusions, optimal control, and mathematical economics. See Selection theorem.

A survey of selectors was published by Claude Ambrose Rogers and John E. Jayne in 2002.

== Bourbaki tau function ==
Nicolas Bourbaki used epsilon calculus for their foundations that had a $\tau$ symbol that could be interpreted as choosing an object (if one existed) that satisfies a given proposition. So if $P(x)$ is a predicate, then $\tau_{x}(P)$ is one particular object that satisfies $P$ (if one exists, otherwise it returns an arbitrary object). Hence we may obtain quantifiers from the choice function, for example $P( \tau_{x}(P))$ was equivalent to $(\exists x)(P(x))$.

However, Bourbaki's choice operator is stronger than usual: it's a global choice operator. That is, it implies the axiom of global choice. Hilbert realized this when introducing epsilon calculus.

== See also ==
- Axiom of countable choice
- Axiom of dependent choice
- Hausdorff paradox
- Hemicontinuity
