= Saint-Martin-Curton =

Saint-Martin-de-Curton
- Commune
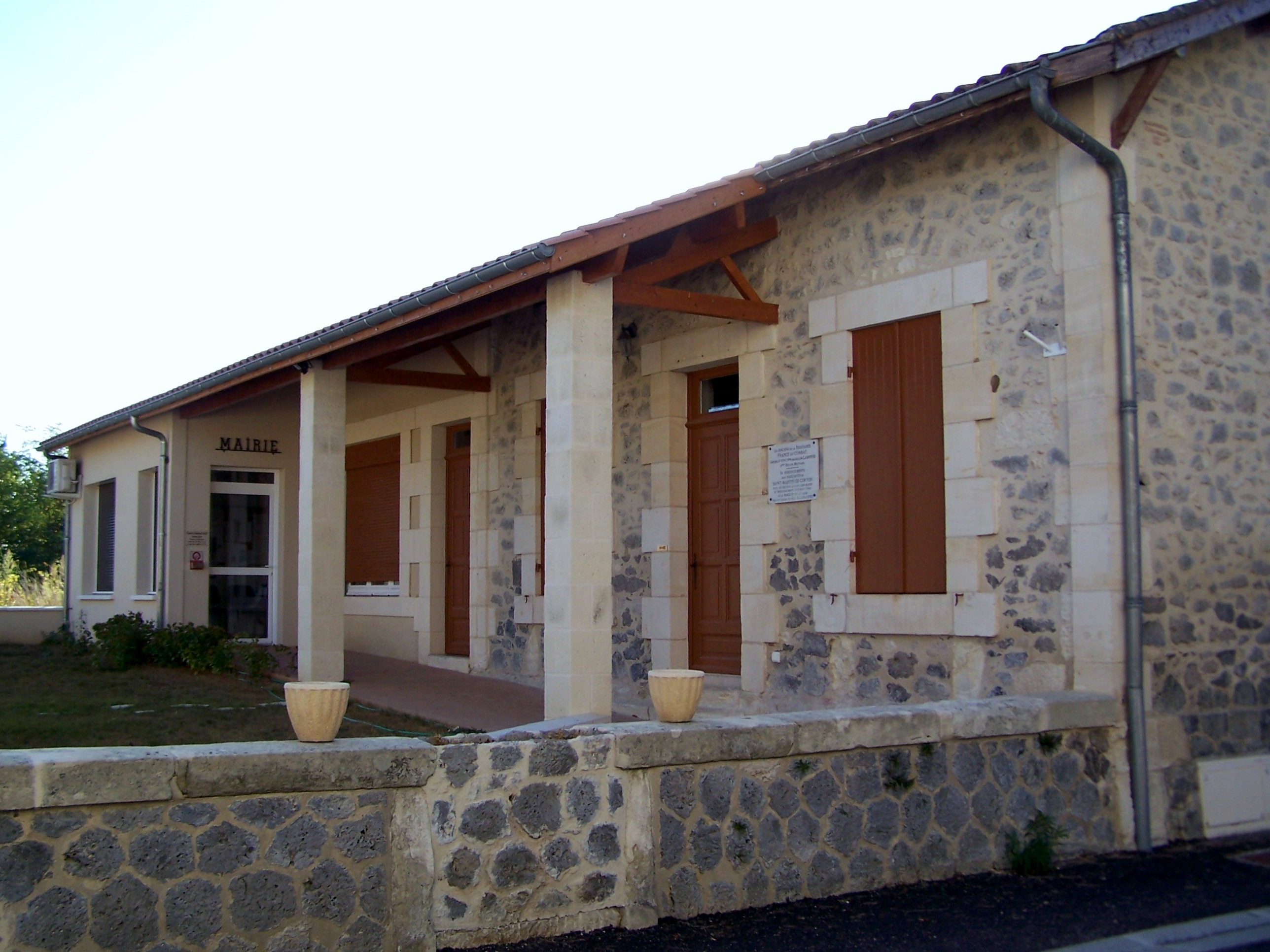
- The town hall in Saint-Martin-Curton
- Location of Saint-Martin-de-Curton
- Location within France Location within Nouvelle-Aquitaine
- Coordinates: 44°19′59″N 0°00′41″E
- Country: France
- Region: Nouvelle-Aquitaine
- Department: Lot-et-Garonne
- Arrondissement: Nérac
- Canton: Les Forêts de Gascogne
- Intercommunality: Coteaux et Landes de Gascogne

Government
  - Mayor (2020–2026): Jean-Paul Glorys
- Area^{1}: 41.48 km^{2} (16.02 sq mi)
- Elevation: 149 m (489 ft)
- Highest elevation: 156 m (512 ft)
- Lowest elevation: 95 m (312 ft)
- Population (2023): 302
  - Density: 7.28/km^{2} (18.9/sq mi)
- Time zone: UTC+01:00 (CET)
  - Summer (DST): UTC+02:00 (CEST)
- INSEE/Postal code: 47254 /47700
- ^{1} French Land Register data, which excludes lakes, ponds, glaciers > 1 km^{2} (0.386 sq mi or 247 acres) and river estuaries.

Saint-Martin-Curton (French pronunciation: [sɛ̃ maʁtɛ̃ kyʁtɔ̃]; Gascon: Sent Martin de Curton) is a commune in the Lot-et-Garonne department in south-western France.

== See also ==
- Communes of the Lot-et-Garonne department
