= Katětov–Tong insertion theorem =

On existence of a continuous function between semicontinuous upper and lower bounds

The Katětov–Tong insertion theorem is a theorem of point-set topology proved independently by Miroslav Katětov and Hing Tong in the 1950s. The theorem states the following:

Let $X$ be a normal topological space and let $g, h\colon X \to \mathbb{R}$ be functions with $g$ upper semicontinuous, $h$ lower semicontinuous, and $g \leq h$. Then there exists a continuous function $f\colon X \to \mathbb{R}$ with $g \leq f \leq h.$

This theorem has a number of applications and is the first of many classical insertion theorems. In particular it implies the Tietze extension theorem and consequently Urysohn's lemma, and so the conclusion of the theorem is equivalent to normality.
