= Hing Tong =

American mathematician (1922–2007)

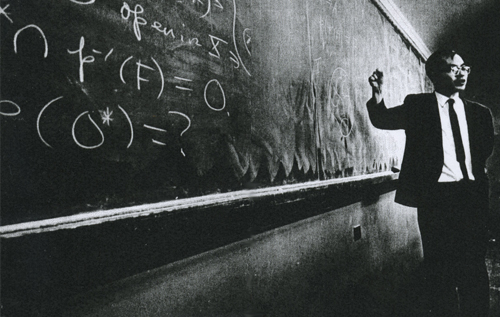
Hing Tong

Hing Tong (16 February 1922 – 4 March 2007) was an American mathematician. He is well known for providing the original proof of the Katetov–Tong insertion theorem.

== Life ==
Hing Tong was born in Canton, China. He received his bachelor's degree from the University of Pennsylvania. In 1947, he received his doctorate in mathematics from Columbia University, where his thesis advisor was Edgar Lorch. In 1956, he married fellow mathematician, Mary Powderly. He was the father of five children.

== Work ==
Hing Tong made many significant contributions to the area of algebraic topology, and served in a number of academic capacities. In 1947, after receiving a National Research Council fellowship, he became an assistant professor at Barnard College (Columbia University). In 1955, he was a visiting scholar at the Institute for Advanced Study in Princeton. Also in 1955, he was appointed professor of mathematics (and eventually chairman of the mathematics department) at Wesleyan University. He later became a professor of mathematics at Fordham University, where he also served as chairman of the department. He was listed among the Outstanding Educators of America in 1973. Tong retired from academia in 1984 to concentrate on research in theoretical physics. A commemorative brick in the Paul Halmos Commemorative Walk at the Carriage House Conference Center of the Mathematical Association of America (MAA) in Washington, DC, reads: "Hing Tong, Topology and Physics".

== Important publications ==
- Hing Tong, "The elements of the theory of transfinite numbers", Columbia University masters dissertation: 1944.
- Hing Tong, "On Ideals Associated with Certain Normed Rings over Topological Spaces", Columbia University Ph.D. dissertation: 1947.
- Hing Tong, "On Some Problems of Cech", The Annals of Mathematics, 2nd Series, Vol. 50, No. 1: January, 1949, pp. 154–157.
- Hing Tong, "On Ideals of Certain Topologized Rings of Continuous Mappings Associated with Topological Spaces", The Annals of Mathematics, 2nd Series, Vol. 50, No. 2: April, 1949, pp. 329–340.
- Hing Tong, "Some characterizations of normal and perfectly normal spaces", Duke Math. J. Volume 19, Number 2: 1952, pp. 289–292.
- Mary Powderly and Hing Tong, "On Orbital Topologies", The Quarterly Journal of Mathematics, 7(1), 1956: pp. 1–2.
- George Kozlowski and Hing Tong, "Two problems of Hewitt on topological expansions", Duke Math. J. Volume 33, Number 3: September, 1966, pp. 475–476.
- Edgar Lorch and Hing Tong, "Continuity of Baire Functions and Order of Baire Sets", Indiana University Mathematics Journal, 16: 1967, pp. 991–995.
- Edgar Lorch and Hing Tong, "A Completeness Theorem on the Group of Baire Equivalences", Indiana University Mathematics Journal, 19: 1970, pp. 189–193.
- Hing Tong, "Non-existence of certain topological expansions", Annali di Matematica Pura ed Applicata, Volume 86, Number 1: December, 1970, pp. 43–45.
- Hing Tong, "Solutions of problems of P. S. Alexandroff on extensions of topological spaces", Annali di Matematica Pura ed Applicata, Volume 86, Number 1: December, 1970, pp. 47–51.
- Edgar Lorch and Hing Tong, "Compactness, metrizability, and Baire isomorphism", Acta Sci. Math. (Szeged) 35: 1973.
- Edgar Lorch and Hing Tong, "On the automorphisms of certain groups of permutations", Bulletin of the Institute of Mathematics Academia Sinica, Volume 2, Number 2: 1974.
- Mary Powderly, Hing Tong, and George Kozlowski, "On a problem of Alexandroff and Hopf", Bulletin of the Institute of Mathematics Academia Sinica, Volume 3, Number 1: 1975.
- Edgar Lorch and Hing Tong, "Baire isomorphisms between certain non-metric spaces", Annali di Matematica Pura ed Applicata, Volume 103, Number 1: December, 1975.
- Edgar Lorch and Hing Tong, "On the automorphisms of the group of Baire equivalences of a complete separable metric space", Bulletin of the Institute of Mathematics Academia Sinica, Volume 6, Number 2: 1978.
