= Set-valued function =

Function whose values are sets (mathematics)

This diagram represents a multi-valued, but not a proper (single-valued) function, because the element 3 in X is associated with two elements, b and c, in Y.

A set-valued function, also called a correspondence or set-valued relation, is a mathematical function that maps elements from one set, the domain of the function, to subsets of another set. Set-valued functions are used in a variety of mathematical fields, including optimization, control theory and game theory.

Set-valued functions are also known as multivalued functions in some references, but this article and the article Multivalued function follow the authors who make a distinction.

== Distinction from multivalued functions ==
Illustration distinguishing multivalued functions from set-valued relations according to the criterion in page 29 of New Developments in Contact Problems by Wriggers and Panatiotopoulos (2014).

Although other authors may distinguish them differently (or not at all), Wriggers and Panatiotopoulos (2014) distinguish multivalued functions from set-valued functions (which they called set-valued relations) by the fact that multivalued functions only take multiple values at finitely (or denumerably) many points, and otherwise behave like a function. Geometrically, this means that the graph of a multivalued function is necessarily a line of zero area that doesn't loop, while the graph of a set-valued relation may contain solid filled areas or loops.

Alternatively, a multivalued function is a set-valued function f that has a further continuity property, namely that the choice of an element in the set $f(x)$ defines a corresponding element in each set $f(y)$ for y close to x, and thus defines locally an ordinary function.

== Example ==
The argmax of a function is in general, multivalued. For example, $\operatorname{argmax}_{x \in \mathbb{R}} \cos(x) = \{2 \pi k\mid k \in \mathbb{Z}\}$.

== Set-valued analysis ==
Set-valued analysis is the study of sets in the spirit of mathematical analysis and general topology.

Instead of considering collections of only points, set-valued analysis considers collections of sets. If a collection of sets is endowed with a topology, or inherits an appropriate topology from an underlying topological space, then the convergence of sets can be studied.

Much of set-valued analysis arose through the study of mathematical economics and optimal control, partly as a generalization of convex analysis; the term "variational analysis" is used by authors such as R. Tyrrell Rockafellar and Roger J-B Wets, Jonathan Borwein and Adrian Lewis, and Boris Mordukhovich. In optimization theory, the convergence of approximating subdifferentials to a subdifferential is important in understanding necessary or sufficient conditions for any minimizing point.

There exist set-valued extensions of the following concepts from point-valued analysis: continuity, differentiation, integration, implicit function theorem, contraction mappings, measure theory, fixed-point theorems, optimization, and topological degree theory. In particular, equations are generalized to inclusions, while differential equations are generalized to differential inclusions.

One can distinguish multiple concepts generalizing continuity, such as the closed graph property and upper and lower hemicontinuity (Note: Some authors use the term ‘semicontinuous’ instead of ‘hemicontinuous’.). There are also various generalizations of measure to multifunctions.

== Applications ==
Set-valued functions arise in optimal control theory, especially differential inclusions and related subjects as game theory, where the Kakutani fixed-point theorem for set-valued functions has been applied to prove existence of Nash equilibria. This among many other properties loosely associated with approximability of upper hemicontinuous multifunctions via continuous functions explains why upper hemicontinuity is more preferred than lower hemicontinuity.

Nevertheless, lower semi-continuous multifunctions usually possess continuous selections as stated in the Michael selection theorem, which provides another characterisation of paracompact spaces. Other selection theorems, like Bressan-Colombo directional continuous selection, Kuratowski and Ryll-Nardzewski measurable selection theorem, Aumann measurable selection, and Fryszkowski selection for decomposable maps are important in optimal control and the theory of differential inclusions.

== See also ==
- Selection theorem
- Ursescu theorem
- Binary relation
