= Hemicontinuity =

Semicontinuity for set-valued functions

In mathematics, upper hemicontinuity and lower hemicontinuity are extensions of the notions of upper and lower semicontinuity of single-valued functions to set-valued functions. A set-valued function that is both upper and lower hemicontinuous is said to be continuous in an analogy to the property of the same name for single-valued functions.

To explain both notions, consider a sequence a of points in a domain, and a sequence b of points in the range. We say that b corresponds to a if each point in b is contained in the image of the corresponding point in a.

- Upper hemicontinuity requires that, for any convergent sequence a in a domain, and for any convergent sequence b that corresponds to a, the image of the limit of a contains the limit of b.
- Lower hemicontinuity requires that, for any convergent sequence a in a domain, and for any point x in the image of the limit of a, there exists a sequence b that corresponds to a subsequence of a, that converges to x.

== Examples ==
This set-valued function is upper hemicontinuous everywhere, but not lower hemicontinuous at $x$ : for a sequence of points $\left(x_m\right)$ that converges to $x,$ we have a $y$ ($y \in f(x)$) such that no sequence of $\left(y_m\right)$ converges to $y$ where each $y_m$ is in $f\left(x_m\right).$

This set-valued function is lower hemicontinuous everywhere, but not upper hemicontinuous at $x,$ because the graph (set) is not closed.

The image on the right shows a function that is not lower hemicontinuous at x. To see this, let a be a sequence that converges to x from the left. The image of x is a vertical line that contains some point (x,y). But every sequence b that corresponds to a is contained in the bottom horizontal line, so it cannot converge to y. In contrast, the function is upper hemicontinuous everywhere. For example, considering any sequence a that converges to x from the left or from the right, and any corresponding sequence b, the limit of b is contained in the vertical line that is the image of the limit of a.

The image on the left shows a function that is not upper hemicontinuous at x. To see this, let a be a sequence that converges to x from the right. The image of a contains vertical lines, so there exists a corresponding sequence b in which all elements are bounded away from f(x). The image of the limit of a contains a single point f(x), so it does not contain the limit of b. In contrast, that function is lower hemicontinuous everywhere. For example, for any sequence a that converges to x, from the left or from the right, f(x) contains a single point, and there exists a corresponding sequence b that converges to f(x).

== Definitions ==
=== Upper hemicontinuity ===
A set-valued function $\Gamma : A \rightrightarrows B$ is said to be upper hemicontinuous at a point $a \in A$ if, for every open $V \subset B$ with $\Gamma(a) \subset V,$ there exists a neighbourhood $U$ of $a$ such that for all $x \in U,$ $\Gamma(x)$ is a subset of $V.$

=== Lower hemicontinuity ===
A set-valued function $\Gamma : A \rightrightarrows B$ is said to be lower hemicontinuous at the point $a \in A$ if for every open set $V$ intersecting $\Gamma(a),$ there exists a neighbourhood $U$ of $a$ such that $\Gamma(x)$ intersects $V$ for all $x \in U.$ (Here $V$ intersects $S$ means nonempty intersection $V \cap S \neq \varnothing$).

=== Continuity ===
If a set-valued function is both upper hemicontinuous and lower hemicontinuous, it is said to be continuous.

== Properties ==
=== Upper hemicontinuity ===
==== Sequential characterization ====
Theorem—For a set-valued function $\Gamma : A \rightrightarrows B$ with closed values, if $\Gamma$ is upper hemicontinuous at $a \in A,$ then for every sequence $a_{\bull} = \left(a_m\right)_{m=1}^{\infty}$ in $A$ and every sequence $\left(b_m\right)_{m=1}^{\infty}$ such that $b_m \in \Gamma\left(a_m\right),$

if $\lim_{m \to \infty} a_m = a$ and $\lim_{m \to \infty} b_m = b$ then $b \in \Gamma(a).$

If $B$ is compact, then the converse is also true.

As an example, look at the image at the right, and consider sequence a in the domain that converges to x (either from the left or from the right). Then, any sequence b that satisfies the requirements converges to some point in f(x).

==== Closed graph theorem ====
The graph of a set-valued function $\Gamma : A \rightrightarrows B$ is the set defined by $Gr(\Gamma) = \{ (a,b) \in A \times B : b \in \Gamma(a) \}.$ The domain of $\Gamma$ is the set of all $a \in A$ such that $\Gamma(a)$ is not empty.

Theorem—If $\Gamma : A \rightrightarrows B$ is an upper hemicontinuous set-valued function with closed domain (that is, the domain of $\Gamma$ is closed) and closed values (i.e. $\Gamma(a)$ is closed for all $a \in A$), then $\operatorname{Gr}(\Gamma)$ is closed.

If $B$ is compact, then the converse is also true.

=== Lower hemicontinuity ===
==== Sequential characterization ====
Theorem—$\Gamma : A \rightrightarrows B$ is lower hemicontinuous at $a \in A$ if and only if for every sequence $a_{\bull} = \left(a_m\right)_{m=1}^{\infty}$ in $A$ such that $a_{\bull} \to a$ in $A$ and all $b \in \Gamma(a),$ there exists a subsequence $\left(a_{m_k}\right)_{k=1}^{\infty}$ of $a_{\bull}$ and also a sequence $b_{\bull} = \left(b_k\right)_{k=1}^{\infty}$ such that $b_{\bull} \to b$ and $b_k \in \Gamma\left(a_{m_k}\right)$ for every $k.$

==== Open graph theorem ====
A set-valued function $\Gamma : A \to B$ is said to have open lower sections if the set $\Gamma^{-1}(b) = \{ a \in A : b \in \Gamma(a) \}$ is open in $A$ for every $b \in B.$ If $\Gamma$ values are all open sets in $B,$ then $\Gamma$ is said to have open upper sections.

If $\Gamma$ has an open graph $\operatorname{Gr}(\Gamma),$ then $\Gamma$ has open upper and lower sections and if $\Gamma$ has open lower sections then it is lower hemicontinuous.

Open Graph Theorem—If $\Gamma : A \to P\left(\R^n\right)$ is a set-valued function with convex values and open upper sections, then $\Gamma$ has an open graph in $A \times \R^n$ if and only if $\Gamma$ is lower hemicontinuous.

=== Operations Preserving Hemicontinuity ===
Set-theoretic, algebraic and topological operations on set-valued functions (like union, composition, sum, convex hull, closure) usually preserve the type of continuity. But this should be taken with appropriate care since, for example, there exists a pair of lower hemicontinuous set-valued functions whose intersection is not lower hemicontinuous. This can be fixed upon strengthening continuity properties: if one of those lower hemicontinuous multifunctions has open graph then their intersection is again lower hemicontinuous.

=== Function Selections ===
Crucial to set-valued analysis (in view of applications) are the investigation of single-valued selections and approximations to set-valued functions. Typically lower hemicontinuous set-valued functions admit single-valued selections (Michael selection theorem, Bressan–Colombo directionally continuous selection theorem, Fryszkowski decomposable map selection). Likewise, upper hemicontinuous maps admit approximations (e.g. Ancel–Granas–Górniewicz–Kryszewski theorem).

== Other concepts of continuity ==
The upper and lower hemicontinuity might be viewed as usual continuity:

Theorem— A set-valued function $\Gamma : A \rightrightarrows B$ with closed values is lower [resp. upper] hemicontinuous if and only if the mapping $\Gamma : A \to P(B)$ is continuous where the hyperspace P(B) has been endowed with the lower [resp. upper] Vietoris topology.

(For the notion of hyperspace compare also power set and function space).

Using lower and upper Hausdorff uniformity we can also define the so-called upper and lower semicontinuous maps in the sense of Hausdorff (also known as metrically lower / upper semicontinuous maps).

== See also ==
- Differential inclusion
- Hausdorff distance – Distance between two metric-space subsets
- Semicontinuity – Property of functions which is weaker than continuity
- Selection theorem - a theorem about constructing a single-valued function from a set-valued function.
