= Differential inclusion =

In mathematics, differential inclusions are a generalization of the concept of ordinary differential equation of the form

$$\frac{dx}{dt}(t)\in F(t,x(t)),$$

where F is a multivalued map, i.e. F(t, x) is a set rather than a single point in $\R^d$. Differential inclusions arise in many situations including differential variational inequalities, projected dynamical systems, Moreau's sweeping process, linear and nonlinear complementarity dynamical systems, discontinuous ordinary differential equations, switching dynamical systems, and fuzzy set arithmetic.

For example, the basic rule for Coulomb friction is that the friction force has magnitude μN in the direction opposite to the direction of slip, where N is the normal force and μ is a constant (the friction coefficient). However, if the slip is zero, the friction force can be any force in the correct plane with magnitude smaller than or equal to μN. Thus, writing the friction force as a function of position and velocity leads to a set-valued function.

In differential inclusion, we not only take a set-valued map at the right hand side but also we can take a subset of a Euclidean space $\mathbb R^N$ for some $N\in \mathbb N$ as following way. Let $n\in \mathbb N$ and $E\subset \mathbb R^{n\times n}\setminus \{0\}.$ Our main purpose is to find a $W^{1,\infty}_{0}(\Omega, \mathbb R^n)$ function $u$ satisfying the differential inclusion $Du \in E$ a.e. in $\Omega,$ where $\Omega\subset \mathbb R^n$ is an open bounded set.

== Theory ==
Existence theory usually assumes that F(t, x) is an upper hemicontinuous function of x, measurable in t, and that F(t, x) is a closed, convex set for all t and x. Existence of solutions for the initial value problem

$$\frac{dx}{dt}(t)\in F(t,x(t)), \quad x(t_0)=x_0$$

for a sufficiently small time interval [t_{0}, t_{0} + ε), ε > 0 then follows. Global existence can be shown provided F does not allow "blow-up" ($\scriptstyle \Vert x(t)\Vert\,\to\,\infty$ as $\scriptstyle t\,\to\, t^*$ for a finite $\scriptstyle t^*$).

Existence theory for differential inclusions with non-convex F(t, x) is an active area of research.

Uniqueness of solutions usually requires other conditions. For example, suppose $F(t,x)$ satisfies a one-sided Lipschitz condition:

$$(x_1-x_2)^T(F(t,x_1)-F(t,x_2))\leq C\Vert x_1-x_2\Vert^2$$

for some C for all x_{1} and x_{2}. Then the initial value problem

$$\frac{dx}{dt}(t)\in F(t,x(t)), \quad x(t_0)=x_0$$

has a unique solution.

This is closely related to the theory of maximal monotone operators, as developed by Minty and Haïm Brezis.

Filippov's theory only allows for discontinuities in the derivative $\frac{dx}{dt}(t)$, but allows no discontinuities in the state, i.e. $x(t)$ need be continuous. Schatzman and later Moreau (who gave it the currently accepted name) extended the notion to measure differential inclusion (MDI) in which the inclusion is evaluated by taking the limit from above for $x(t)$.

== Applications ==
Differential inclusions can be used to understand and suitably interpret discontinuous ordinary differential equations, such as arise for Coulomb friction in mechanical systems and ideal switches in power electronics. An important contribution has been made by A. F. Filippov, who studied regularizations of discontinuous equations. Further, the technique of regularization was used by N.N. Krasovskii in the theory of differential games.

Differential inclusions are also found at the foundation of non-smooth dynamical systems (NSDS) analysis, which is used in the analog study of switching electrical circuits using idealized component equations (for example using idealized, straight vertical lines for the sharply exponential forward and breakdown conduction regions of a diode characteristic) and in the study of certain non-smooth mechanical system such as stick-slip oscillations in systems with dry friction or the dynamics of impact phenomena. Software that solves NSDS systems exists, such as INRIA's Siconos.

In continuous function when Fuzzy concept is used in differential inclusion a new concept comes as Fuzzy differential inclusion which has application in Atmospheric dispersion modeling and Cybernetics in Medical imaging.

== See also ==
- Stiffness, which affects ODEs/DAEs for functions with "sharp turns" and which affects numerical convergence
