= Using the Borsuk–Ulam Theorem =

Mathematics textbook

Using the Borsuk–Ulam Theorem: Lectures on Topological Methods in Combinatorics and Geometry
- Author: Jiří Matoušek
- Subject: Topological combinatorics
- Genre: Mathematics
- Publisher: Springer-Verlag
- Publication date: 2003
- ISBN: 978-3-540-00362-5

Using the Borsuk–Ulam Theorem: Lectures on Topological Methods in Combinatorics and Geometry is a graduate-level mathematics textbook in topological combinatorics. It describes the use of results in topology, and in particular the Borsuk–Ulam theorem, to prove theorems in combinatorics and discrete geometry. It was written by Czech mathematician Jiří Matoušek, and published in 2003 by Springer-Verlag in their Universitext series (ISBN 978-3-540-00362-5).

== Topics ==
The topic of the book is part of a relatively new field of mathematics crossing between topology and combinatorics, now called topological combinatorics. The starting point of the field, and one of the central inspirations for the book, was a proof that László Lovász published in 1978 of a 1955 conjecture by Martin Kneser, according to which the Kneser graphs $KG_{2n+k,n}$ have no graph coloring with $k+1$ colors. Lovász used the Borsuk–Ulam theorem in his proof, and Matoušek gathers many related results, published subsequently, to show that this connection between topology and combinatorics is not just a proof trick but an area.

The book has six chapters. After two chapters reviewing the basic notions of algebraic topology, and proving the Borsuk–Ulam theorem, the applications to combinatorics and geometry begin in the third chapter, with topics including the ham sandwich theorem, the necklace splitting problem, Gale's lemma on points in hemispheres, and several results on colorings of Kneser graphs. After another chapter on more advanced topics in equivariant topology, two more chapters of applications follow, separated according to whether the equivariance is modulo two or using a more complicated group action. Topics in these chapters include the van Kampen–Flores theorem on embeddability of skeletons of simplices into lower-dimensional Euclidean spaces, and topological and multicolored variants of Radon's theorem and Tverberg's theorem on partitions into subsets with intersecting convex hulls.

== Audience and reception ==
The book is written at a graduate level, and has exercises making it suitable as a graduate textbook. Some knowledge of topology would be helpful for readers but is not necessary. Reviewer Mihaela Poplicher writes that it is not easy to read, but is "very well written, very interesting, and very informative". And reviewer Imre Bárány writes that "The book is well written, and the style is lucid and pleasant, with plenty of illustrative examples."

Matoušek intended this material to become part of a broader textbook on topological combinatorics, to be written jointly with him, Anders Björner, and Günter M. Ziegler. However, this was not completed before Matoušek's untimely death in 2015.
