= Consensus division =

Consensus division may refer to:

- Consensus splitting, also called exact division: a division of a resource to two or more subsets such that all people agree on the values of the subsets.
- Consensus decision-making, a division of a resource among several people, such that all of them accept the division without dispute.
- In American college football, a consensus division champion is the winner of a division chosen by a rule using various votes rather than by a tournament.
