= KKMS =

KKMS may refer to:

- Knaster–Kuratowski–Mazurkiewicz lemma#The KKMS theorem, in mathematics and economics
- KKMS (AM), a radio station (980 AM) licensed to serve Richfield, Minnesota, United States
- The Kidd Kraddick Morning Show, an American syndicated morning radio show.
