= Jiří Matoušek (mathematician) =

Czech mathematician (1963–2015)

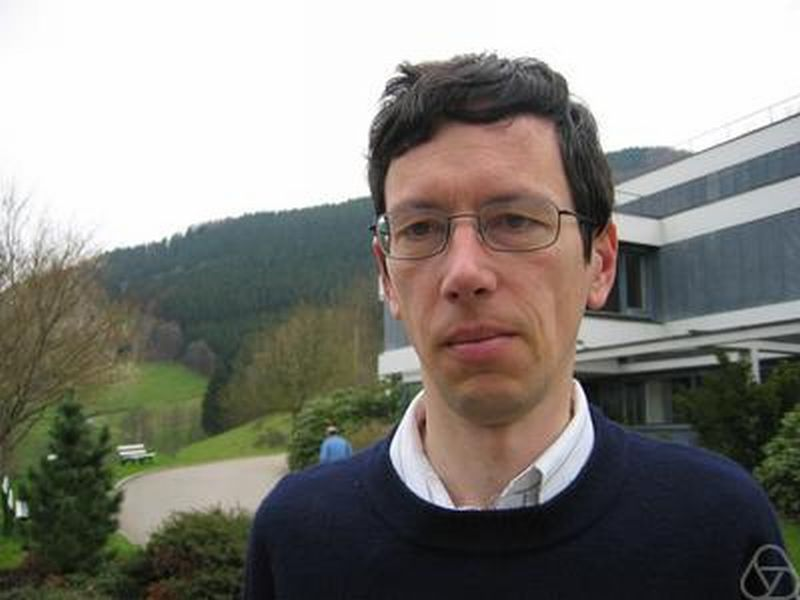
- Jiří Matoušek at the Mathematical Research Institute of Oberwolfach, 2005
- Born: 10 March 1963; Prague, Czechoslovakia
- Died: 9 March 2015 (aged 51); Prague, Czechia
- Education: Charles University
- Scientific career
- Fields: Mathematics
- Workplaces: Charles University; ETH Zurich
- Academic advisors: Miroslav Katětov

Jiří "Jirka" Matoušek (10 March 1963 – 9 March 2015) was a Czech mathematician working in computational geometry and algebraic topology. He was a professor at Charles University in Prague and the author of several textbooks and research monographs.

== Biography ==
Matoušek was born in Prague. In 1986, he received his Master's degree at Charles University under Miroslav Katětov. From 1986 until his death he was employed at the Department of Applied Mathematics of Charles University, holding a professor position since 2000. He was also a visiting and later full professor at ETH Zurich.

In 1996, he won the European Mathematical Society prize and in 2000 he won the Scientist award of the Learned Society of the Czech Republic. In 1998 he was an Invited Speaker of the International Congress of Mathematicians in Berlin. He became a fellow of the Learned Society of the Czech Republic in 2005.

Matoušek's paper on computational aspects of algebraic topology won the Best Paper award at the 2012 ACM Symposium on Discrete Algorithms.

Aside from his own academic writing, he has translated the popularization book Mathematics: A Very Short Introduction by Timothy Gowers into Czech. He was a supporter and signatory of the Cost of Knowledge protest.

Matoušek died in 2015 in Prague, aged 51. In 2021, a lecture hall at the Faculty of Mathematics and Physics, Charles University, was named after him.

== Books ==
- Invitation to Discrete Mathematics (with Jaroslav Nešetřil). Oxford University Press, 1998. ISBN 978-0-19-850207-4. Translated into French by Delphine Hachez as Introduction aux Mathématiques Discrètes, Springer-Verlag, 2004, ISBN 978-2-287-20010-6.
- Geometric Discrepancy: An Illustrated Guide. Springer-Verlag, Algorithms and Combinatorics 18, 1999, ISBN 978-3-540-65528-2.
- Lectures on Discrete Geometry. Springer-Verlag, Graduate Texts in Mathematics, 2002, ISBN 978-0-387-95373-1.
- Using the Borsuk-Ulam Theorem: Lectures on Topological Methods in Combinatorics and Geometry. Springer-Verlag, 2003. ISBN 978-3-540-00362-5.
- Topics in Discrete Mathematics: Dedicated to Jarik Nešetřil on the Occasion of His 60th Birthday (with Martin Klazar, Jan Kratochvíl, Martin Loebl, Robin Thomas, and Pavel Valtr). Springer-Verlag, Algorithms and Combinatorics 26, 2006. ISBN 978-3-540-33698-3.
- Understanding and Using Linear Programming (with B. Gärtner). Springer-Verlag, Universitext, 2007, ISBN 978-3-540-30697-9.
- Thirty-three miniatures — Mathematical and algorithmic applications of linear algebra. American Mathematical Society, 2010, ISBN 978-0-8218-4977-4.
- Approximation Algorithms and Semidefinite Programming (with B. Gärtner). Springer Berlin Heidelberg, 2012, ISBN 978-3-642-22014-2.
- Mathematics++: Selected Topics Beyond the Basic Courses (with Ida Kantor and Robert Šámal). American Mathematical Society, 2015, ISBN 978-1-4704-2261-5.

== See also ==
- Ham sandwich theorem
- Discrepancy theory
- Kneser graph
