= Equivariant map =

Maps whose domain and codomain are acted on by the same group, and the map commutes

In mathematics, equivariance is a form of symmetry for functions from one space with symmetry to another (such as symmetric spaces). A function is said to be an equivariant map when its domain and codomain are acted on by the same symmetry group, and when the function commutes with the action of the group. That is, applying a symmetry transformation and then computing the function produces the same result as computing the function and then applying the transformation.

Equivariant maps generalize the concept of invariants, functions whose value is unchanged by a symmetry transformation of their argument. The value of an equivariant map is often (imprecisely) called an invariant.

In statistical inference, equivariance under statistical transformations of data is an important property of various estimation methods; see invariant estimator for details. In pure mathematics, equivariance is a central object of study in equivariant topology and its subtopics equivariant cohomology and equivariant stable homotopy theory.

== Examples ==
=== Elementary geometry ===
The centroid of a triangle (where the three red segments meet) is equivariant under affine transformations: the centroid of a transformed triangle is the same point as the transformation of the centroid of the triangle.

In the geometry of triangles, the area and perimeter of a triangle are invariants under Euclidean transformations: translating, rotating, or reflecting a triangle does not change its area or perimeter. However, triangle centers such as the centroid, circumcenter, incenter and orthocenter are not invariant, because moving a triangle will also cause its centers to move. Instead, these centers are equivariant: applying any Euclidean congruence (a combination of a translation and rotation) to a triangle, and then constructing its center, produces the same point as constructing the center first, and then applying the same congruence to the center. More generally, all triangle centers are also equivariant under similarity transformations (combinations of translation, rotation, reflection, and scaling), and the centroid is equivariant under affine transformations.

The same function may be an invariant for one group of symmetries and equivariant for a different group of symmetries. For instance, under similarity transformations instead of congruences the area and perimeter are no longer invariant: scaling a triangle also changes its area and perimeter. However, these changes happen in a predictable way: if a triangle is scaled by a factor of s, the perimeter also scales by s and the area scales by s^{2}. In this way, the function mapping each triangle to its area or perimeter can be seen as equivariant for a multiplicative group action of the scaling transformations on the positive real numbers.

=== Statistics ===
Another class of simple examples comes from statistical estimation. The mean of a sample (a set of real numbers) is commonly used as a central tendency of the sample. It is equivariant under linear transformations of the real numbers, so for instance it is unaffected by the choice of units used to represent the numbers. By contrast, the mean is not equivariant with respect to nonlinear transformations such as exponentials.

The median of a sample is equivariant for a much larger group of transformations, the (strictly) monotonic functions of the real numbers. This analysis indicates that the median is more robust against certain kinds of changes to a data set, and that (unlike the mean) it is meaningful for ordinal data.

The concepts of an invariant estimator and equivariant estimator have been used to formalize this style of analysis.

=== Representation theory ===
In the representation theory of finite groups, a vector space equipped with a group that acts by linear transformations of the space is called a linear representation of the group. A linear map that commutes with the action is called an intertwiner. That is, an intertwiner is just an equivariant linear map between two representations. Alternatively, an intertwiner for representations of a group G over a field K is the same thing as a module homomorphism of K[G]-modules, where K[G] is the group ring of G.

Under some conditions, if X and Y are both irreducible representations, then an intertwiner (other than the zero map) only exists if the two representations are equivalent (that is, are isomorphic as modules). That intertwiner is then unique up to a multiplicative factor (a non-zero scalar from K). These properties hold when the image of K[G] is a simple algebra, with centre K (by what is called Schur's lemma: see simple module). As a consequence, in important cases the construction of an intertwiner is enough to show the representations are effectively the same.

== Formalization ==
Equivariance can be formalized using the concept of a G-set for a group G. This is a mathematical object consisting of a mathematical set S and a group action (on the left) of G on S. If X and Y are both G-sets for the same group G, then a function f : X → Y is said to be equivariant if

f(g·x) = g·f(x)

for all g ∈ G and all x in X.

If one or both of the actions are right actions the equivariance condition may be suitably modified:

f(x·g) = f(x)·g; (right-right)
f(x·g) = g^{−1}·f(x); (right-left)
f(g·x) = f(x)·g^{−1}; (left-right)

Equivariant maps are morphisms in the category of G-sets (for a fixed G). Hence they are also known as G-morphisms, G-maps, or G-homomorphisms. Isomorphisms of G-sets are simply bijective equivariant maps.

The equivariance condition can also be understood as the following commutative diagram. Note that $g\cdot$ denotes the map that takes an element $z$ and returns $g\cdot z$.

== Generalization ==
Equivariant maps can be generalized to arbitrary categories in a straightforward manner. Every group G can be viewed as a category with a single object (morphisms in this category are just the elements of G). Given an arbitrary category C, a representation of G in the category C is a functor from G to C. Such a functor selects an object of C and a subgroup of automorphisms of that object. For example, a G-set is equivalent to a functor from G to the category of sets, Set, and a linear representation is equivalent to a functor to the category of vector spaces over a field, Vect_{K}.

Given two representations, ρ and σ, of G in C, an equivariant map between those representations is simply a natural transformation from ρ to σ. Using natural transformations as morphisms, one can form the category of all representations of G in C. This is just the functor category C^{G}.

For another example, take C = Top, the category of topological spaces. A representation of G in Top is a topological space on which G acts continuously. An equivariant map is then a continuous map f: X → Y between representations which commutes with the action of G.

== See also ==
- Curtis–Hedlund–Lyndon theorem, a characterization of cellular automata in terms of equivariant maps
