= John R. Rice (computer scientist) =

American mathematician (1934–2024)

John Rischard Rice (June 6, 1934 – January 7, 2024) was an American mathematician and computer scientist. He was the W. Brooks Fortune Distinguished Professor Emeritus of Computer Science and a professor of mathematics (by courtesy) at Purdue University. He specialized in numerical computing, founded the ACM Transactions on Mathematical Software and was the author of more than 20 books and approximately 300 research articles.

== Biography ==
Rice was born on June 6, 1934, in Tulsa, Oklahoma, and grew up in small towns in Oklahoma. As a teenager, his father was assigned to Addis Ababa, Ethiopia, where he lived for three years. He earned bachelor's and master's degrees in mathematics from Oklahoma State University in 1954 and 1956; while studying there, he spent his summers in southern California, working in the aerospace industry. He then moved to the California Institute of Technology, where he earned a Ph.D. in 1959 under the supervision of Arthur Erdélyi; his dissertation concerned approximation theory. After taking a one-year postdoctoral position at the National Bureau of Standards, he became a researcher for General Motors. In 1964 he left GM and joined the recently founded computer science department at Purdue, which he later headed from 1983 to 1996

Rice organized the first Symposium on Mathematical Software at Purdue University in 1970, which produced the recommendation to start a journal for the field. This led to the founding of ACM Transactions on Mathematical Software (TOMS) in 1975, of which Rice would be editor-in-chief until 1993. He was chair of the Computing Research Association from 1991 to 1993.

Rice died at home on January 7, 2024, at the age of 89.

== Research ==
Rice showed an early interest in computing, publishing a paper titled "Electronic Brains" as a college sophomore. Although his early research was on the mathematics of approximation theory, he spent most of his career working in the analysis of algorithms for solving numerical problems, and particularly on the solution of elliptic partial differential equations.

== Books ==
Rice's Introduction to Computer Science (with J. K. Rice, published by Holt, Rinehart, and Winston in 1969) was the "leading textbook of the day" and emphasized general principles of algorithms and data structures rather than specific programming languages, the focus of previous introductory CS texts. It was translated into three other languages.

Rice's other books include:

- Solving Elliptic Problems with ELLPACK (Springer-Verlag, 1985)
- Mathematical Aspects of Scientific Software (Springer-Verlag, 1988)
- Expert Systems for Scientific Computing (North Holland, 1992)
- Enabling Technologies for Computational Science (Kluwer, 2000)

== Awards and honors ==
Rice was named the Brooks Fortune Professor in 1989. In 1994, he was elected a member of the National Academy of Engineering for his "for leadership in founding the field of mathematical software and for fundamental contributions to its content". He is also a Fellow of the AAAS and a Fellow of the Association for Computing Machinery.

== See also ==
- Hobby–Rice theorem
