= Equivariant topology =

Study of spaces with group actions

In mathematics, equivariant topology is the study of topological spaces that possess certain symmetries. In studying topological spaces, one often considers continuous maps $f: X \to Y$, and while equivariant topology also considers such maps, there is the additional constraint that each map "respects symmetry" in both its domain and target spaces.

The notion of symmetry is usually captured by considering a group action of a group $G$ on $X$ and $Y$ and requiring that $f$ is equivariant under this action, so that $f(g\cdot x) = g \cdot f(x)$ for all $x \in X$, a property usually denoted by $f: X \to_{G} Y$. Heuristically speaking, standard topology views two spaces as equivalent "up to deformation," while equivariant topology considers spaces equivalent up to deformation so long as it pays attention to any symmetry possessed by both spaces. A famous theorem of equivariant topology is the Borsuk–Ulam theorem, which asserts that every $\mathbf{Z}_2$-equivariant map $f: S^n \to \mathbb R^n$ necessarily vanishes.

== Induced G-bundles ==
An important construction used in equivariant cohomology and other applications includes a naturally occurring group bundle (see principal bundle for details).

Let us first consider the case where $G$ acts freely on $X$. Then, given a $G$-equivariant map $f:X \to_G Y$, we obtain sections $s_f: X/G \to (X \times Y)/G$ given by $[x] \mapsto [x,f(x)]$, where $X \times Y$ gets the diagonal action $g(x,y)=(gx,gy)$, and the bundle is $p: (X \times Y)/G \to X/G$, with fiber $Y$ and projection given by $p([x,y])=[x]$. Often, the total space is written $X \times_G Y$.

More generally, the assignment $s_f$ actually does not map to $(X \times Y)/G$ generally. Since $f$ is equivariant, if $g \in G_x$ (the isotropy subgroup), then by equivariance, we have that $g \cdot f(x)=f(g \cdot x)=f(x)$, so in fact $f$ will map to the collection of $\{[x,y] \in (X \times Y)/G \mid G_x \subset G_y\}$. In this case, one can replace the bundle by a homotopy quotient where $G$ acts freely and is bundle homotopic to the induced bundle on $X$ by $f$.

== Applications to discrete geometry ==
In the same way that one can deduce the ham sandwich theorem from the Borsuk-Ulam Theorem, one can find many applications of equivariant topology to problems of discrete geometry. This is accomplished by using the configuration-space test-map paradigm:

Given a geometric problem $P$, we define the configuration space, $X$, which parametrizes all associated solutions to the problem (such as points, lines, or arcs.) Additionally, we consider a test space $Z \subset V$ and a map $f:X \to V$ where $p \in X$ is a solution to a problem if and only if $f(p) \in Z$. Finally, it is usual to consider natural symmetries in a discrete problem by some group $G$ that acts on $X$ and $V$ so that $f$ is equivariant under these actions. The problem is solved if we can show the nonexistence of an equivariant map $f: X \to V \setminus Z$.

Obstructions to the existence of such maps are often formulated algebraically from the topological data of $X$ and $V \setminus Z$. An archetypal example of such an obstruction can be derived having $V$ a vector space and $Z = \{0\}$. In this case, a nonvanishing map would also induce a nonvanishing section $s_f:x \mapsto [x,f(x)]$ from the discussion above, so $\omega_n(X \times_G Y)$, the top Stiefel–Whitney class would need to vanish.

== Examples ==
- The identity map $i:X \to X$ will always be equivariant.
- If we let $\mathbf{Z}_2$ act antipodally on the unit circle, then $z \mapsto z^3$ is equivariant, since it is an odd function.
- Any map $h:X \to X/G$ is equivariant when $G$ acts trivially on the quotient, since $h(g\cdot x)=h(x)$ for all $x$.

== See also ==
- Equivariant cohomology
- Equivariant stable homotopy theory
- G-spectrum
