= Lusternik–Schnirelmann theorem =

Existence of antipodal pairs in covers of spheres

A two-dimensional sphere S^{2} covered by three closed sets, the closures of the red, yellow, and blue areas, in the pattern of a cuboctahedron. The red and yellow sets do not contain any antipodal pairs (each red or yellow triangle is opposite a triangle of the other color), but the center of each blue quadrilateral is antipodal to another blue quadrilateral.

In mathematics, the Lusternik–Schnirelmann theorem, aka Lusternik–Schnirelmann–Borsuk theorem or LSB theorem gives a sufficient condition for the inclusion of antipodal points in a cover of a sphere.

It is named after Lazar Lyusternik and Lev Schnirelmann, who published it in 1930.

== Statement ==
The sphere or hypersphere $S^n$ is an $n$-dimensional surface, conventionally embedded as the set of unit vectors in the $(n+1)$-dimensional space $\mathbb{R}^{n+1}$. In this embedding, the pairs of unit vectors $(x,-x)$ are antipodal (polar opposites). A cover is a family of subsets of the sphere whose union is the entire sphere. Intuitively, a subset of the sphere is a closed set if it includes all of its boundary points, or more formally if it contains all limits of sequences of points in the subset. The Lusternik–Schnirelmann theorem can then be stated as:

Lusternik–Schnirelmann theorem—If the sphere $S^n$ is covered by $n+1$ closed sets, then at least one of these sets contains a pair of antipodal points.

The related Lusternik–Schnirelmann category of a topological space is the minimum number of subsets in a cover for which each subset is topologically simple (in a technical sense). It is at most two for a sphere, which can be covered by two hemispheres. However, the sphere can be used to construct a more complicated projective space $\mathbb{RP}^n$, the quotient space obtained by treating each pair of antipodal points as a single point. The Lusternik–Schnirelmann theorem implies that the Lusternik–Schnirelmann category of $\mathbb{RP}^n$ is at least $n+1$, and it turns out to equal $n+1$.

== Proof ==
The theorem can be proved by leveraging the relationship between $S^n$ and $\mathbb{RP}^n$, and the Borsuk-Ulam theorem in higher dimensions.

Real projective space $\mathbb{RP}^n$ is defined as the quotient space of $S^n$ by the antipodal map, where each point $x \in S^n$ is identified with its antipodal point $-x \in S^n$. In other words, $\mathbb{RP}^n = S^n / \sim$, where $x \sim -x$.

A pair of antipodal points in $S^n$ corresponds to a single point in $\mathbb{RP}^n$. The concept of "containing a pair of antipodal points" in a subset of $S^n$ is equivalent to that subset having a non-empty intersection with the pre-image of some point in $\mathbb{RP}^n$ under the projection map $\pi: S^n \to \mathbb{RP}^n$.

The Borsuk-Ulam theorem states that for any continuous map $f: S^n \to \mathbb{R}^n$, there exists at least one pair of antipodal points $\{x, -x\}$ in $S^n$ such that $f(x) = f(-x)$.

Consider $S^n$ expressed as the union of $n+1$ closed sets $A_1, A_2, \ldots, A_{n+1}$.

Define distance functions $d_i(x) = \inf_{y \in A_i} |x-y|$ for $i=1, \ldots, n$. These are continuous functions.

Construct a map $F: S^n \to \mathbb{R}^n$ given by $F(x) = (d_1(x), d_2(x), \ldots, d_n(x))$.

By the Borsuk-Ulam theorem, there exists a pair of antipodal points $\{x_0, -x_0\}$ such that $F(x_0) = F(-x_0)$, meaning $d_i(x_0) = d_i(-x_0)$ for all $i=1, \ldots, n$.

If any $d_i(x_0) = 0$, then $x_0 \in A_i$. Since $d_i(x_0) = d_i(-x_0) = 0$, then $-x_0 \in A_i$ as well (because $A_i$ is closed). Thus, $A_i$ contains a pair of antipodal points.

If $d_i(x_0) > 0$ for all $i=1, \ldots, n$, then $x_0 \notin A_i$ for $i=1, \ldots, n$. Since $S^n = \bigcup_{j=1}^{n+1} A_j$, it must be that $x_0 \in A_{n+1}$. Similarly, since $d_i(-x_0) > 0$ for all $i=1, \ldots, n$, then $-x_0 \notin A_i$ for $i=1, \ldots, n$, implying $-x_0 \in A_{n+1}$. Therefore, $A_{n+1}$ contains a pair of antipodal points.

== Equivalent results ==
There are several fixed-point theorems which come in three equivalent variants: an algebraic topology variant, a combinatorial variant and a set-covering variant. Each variant can be proved separately using totally different arguments, but each variant can also be reduced to the other variants in its row. Additionally, each result in the top row can be deduced from the one below it in the same column.

Algebraic topology	Combinatorics	Set covering
Brouwer fixed-point theorem	Sperner's lemma	Knaster–Kuratowski–Mazurkiewicz lemma
Borsuk–Ulam theorem	Tucker's lemma	Lusternik–Schnirelmann theorem
