= Necklace (combinatorics) =

Equivalence class in mathematics

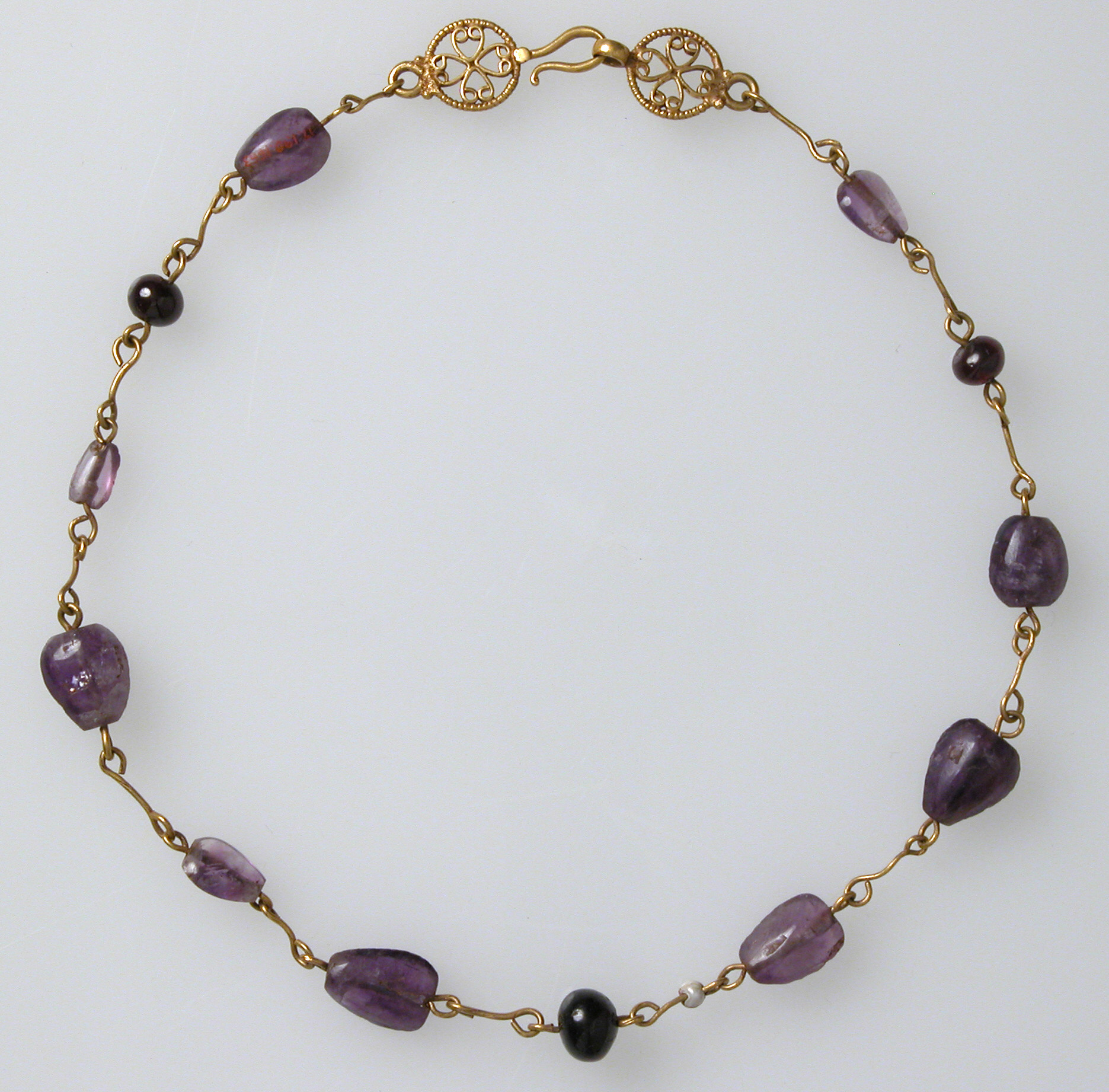
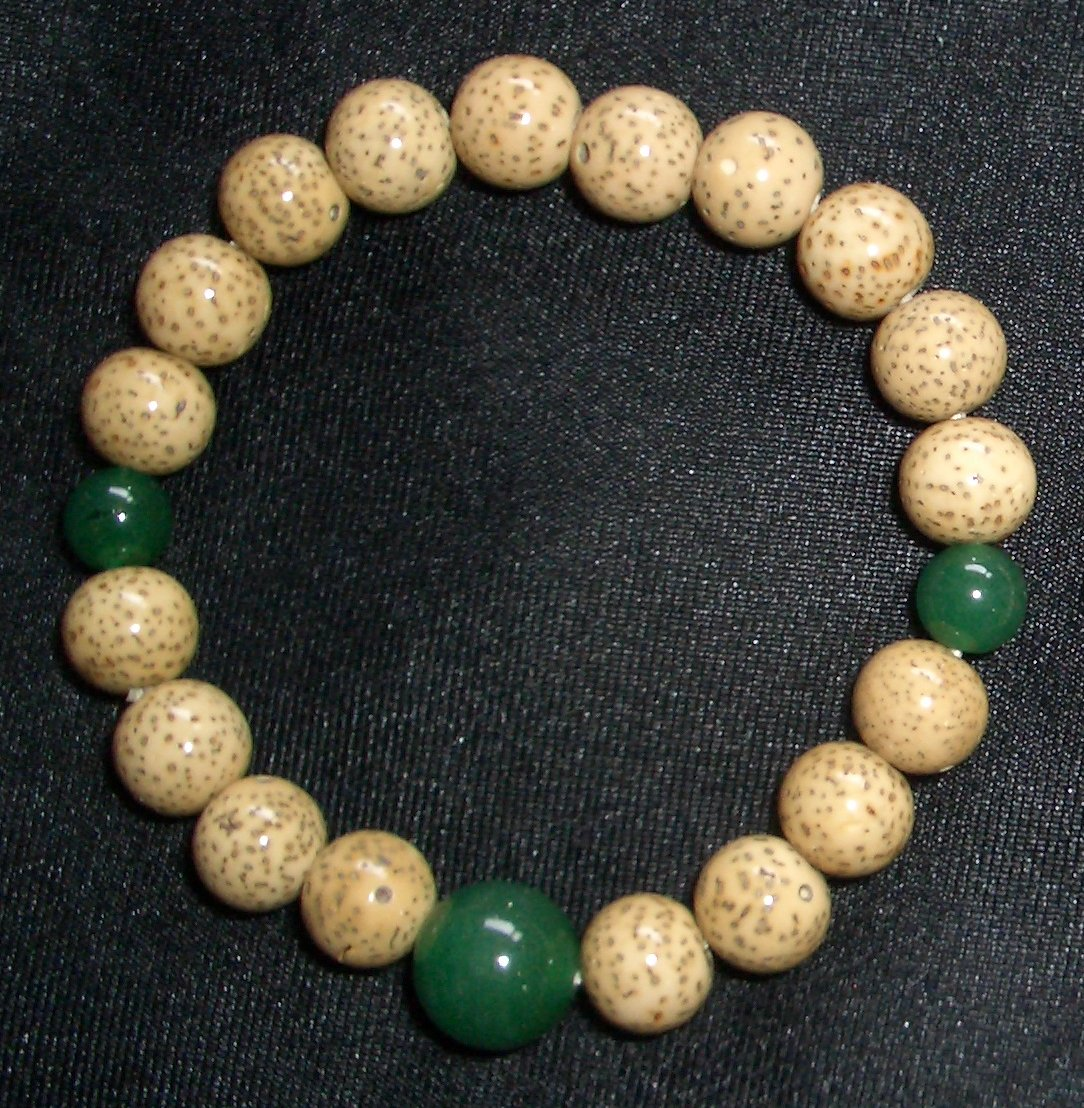
Actual necklace and bracelet with their combinatorial interpretations

The 3 bracelets with 3 red and 3 green beads. The one in the middle is chiral, so there are 4 necklaces. Compare box(6,9) in the triangle.

The 11 bracelets with 2 red, 2 yellow and 2 green beads. The leftmost one and the four rightmost ones are chiral, so there are 16 necklaces. Compare box(6,7) in the triangle.

16 tiles from the game Tantrix, corresponding to the 16 necklaces with 2 red, 2 yellow and 2 green beads

In combinatorics, a k-ary necklace of length n is an equivalence class of n-character strings over an alphabet of size k, taking all rotations as equivalent. It represents a structure with n circularly connected beads which have k available colors.

A k-ary bracelet, also referred to as a turnover (or free) necklace, is a necklace such that strings may also be equivalent under reflection. That is, given two strings, if each is the reverse of the other, they belong to the same equivalence class. For this reason, a necklace might also be called a fixed necklace to distinguish it from a turnover necklace.

Formally, one may represent a necklace as an orbit of the cyclic group acting on n-character strings over an alphabet of size k, and a bracelet as an orbit of the dihedral group. One can count these orbits, and thus necklaces and bracelets, using Pólya's enumeration theorem.

== Equivalence classes ==
=== Number of necklaces ===
There are

$$N_n(k)=\frac{1}{n}\sum_{d\mid n}\varphi(d)k^{n/d} = \frac{1}{n} \sum_{i=1}^n k^{\, {\rm gcd}(i, n)}$$

different k-ary necklaces of length n, where $\varphi$ is Euler's totient function. When the beads are restricted to particular color multiset $\mathcal{B} = \{1^{n_1},\ldots,k^{n_k} \}$, where $n_i$ is the number of beads of color $i \in \{1,\ldots,k\}$, there are

$$N(\mathcal{B}) = \frac{1}{|\mathcal{B}|} \sum_{d | {\rm gcd}(n_1,\ldots,n_k)} {|\mathcal{B}|/d \choose n_{1}/d, \ldots, n_{k}/d} \phi(d)$$

different necklaces made of all the beads of $\mathcal{B}$. Here $|\mathcal{B}| := \sum\limits_{i=1}^k n_i$ and ${m \choose m_1, \ldots, m_k} := \frac{m!}{m_1! \cdots m_k!}$ is the multinomial coefficient. These two formulas follow directly from Pólya's enumeration theorem applied to the action of the cyclic group $C_n$ acting on the set of all functions $f : \{1,\ldots,n\} \to\{1,\ldots,k\}$. If all k colors must be used, the count is

$$L_n(k)=\frac{k!}{n}\sum_{d\mid n}\varphi(d)S\left(\frac{n}{d}, k\right)\;,$$

where $S(n, k)$ are the Stirling number of the second kind.

$N_n(k)$ (sequence A054631 in the OEIS) and $L_n(k)$ (sequence A087854 in the OEIS) are related via the Binomial coefficients:

$$N_n(k)=\sum_{j=1}^k\binom{k}{j} L_n(j)$$

and

$$L_n(k)=\sum_{j=1}^k(-1)^{k-j}\binom{k}{j}N_n(j)$$

=== Number of bracelets ===
The number of different k-ary bracelets of length n (sequence A081720 in the OEIS) is

$$B_n(k) = \begin{cases}
\tfrac12 N_n(k) + \tfrac14 (k+1)k^{n/2} & \text{if }n\text{ is even,} \\[10px]
\tfrac12 N_n(k) + \tfrac12 k^{(n+1)/2} & \text{if }n\text{ is odd,}
\end{cases}$$

where $N_n(k)$ is the number of k-ary necklaces of length n. This follows from Pólya's method applied to the action of the dihedral group $D_n$.

=== Canonicalization ===
There are many ways to specify a standard rotation of a given k-ary necklace. One of the simplest methods is interpret each letter of the alphabet as a digit in base k and a given rotation as a number in base k. The necklace then be standardized by selecting the rotation that yields the greatest number. The smallest number cannot be chosen because otherwise two necklaces of varying lengths may compare equal due differing numbers of leading zeros not being enough to distinguish between two numbers.

== Case of distinct beads ==
Possible patterns of bracelets of length n corresponding to the k-th integer partition (set partitions up to rotation and reflection)

For a given set of n beads, all distinct, the number of distinct necklaces made from these beads, counting rotated necklaces as the same, is n!/n = (n − 1)!. This is because the beads can be linearly ordered in n! ways, and the n circular shifts of such an ordering all give the same necklace. Similarly, the number of distinct bracelets, counting rotated and reflected bracelets as the same, is n!/2n, for n ≥ 3.

If the beads are not all distinct, having repeated colors, then there are fewer necklaces (and bracelets). The above necklace-counting polynomials give the number necklaces made from all possible multisets of beads. Polya's pattern inventory polynomial refines the counting polynomial, using variable for each bead color, so that the coefficient of each monomial counts the number of necklaces on a given multiset of beads.

== Aperiodic necklaces ==
An aperiodic necklace of length n is a rotation equivalence class having size n, i.e., no two distinct rotations of a necklace from such class are equal.

According to Moreau's necklace-counting function, there are

$$M_n(k)=\frac{1}{n}\sum_{d\mid n}\mu(d)k^{n/d}$$

different k-ary aperiodic necklaces of length n, where μ is the Möbius function. The two necklace-counting functions are related by: $N_n(k) = \sum_{d|n} M_n(k),$ where the sum is over all divisors of n, which is equivalent by Möbius inversion to $M_n(k) = \sum_{d|n} N_d(k)\,\mu\bigl(\tfrac{n}{d}\bigr).$

Each aperiodic necklace contains a single Lyndon word so that Lyndon words form representatives of aperiodic necklaces.

== See also ==
- Lyndon word
- Inversion (discrete mathematics)
- Necklace problem
- Necklace splitting problem
- Permutation
- Proofs of Fermat's little theorem#Proof by counting necklaces
- Forte number, a representation of binary bracelets of length 12 used in atonal music.
