= Hobby–Rice theorem =

Necklace splitting problem

In mathematics, and in particular the necklace splitting problem, the Hobby–Rice theorem is a result that is useful in establishing the existence of certain solutions. It was proved in 1965 by Charles R. Hobby and John R. Rice; a simplified proof was given in 1976 by A. Pinkus.

== The theorem ==
Define a partition of the interval [0,1] as a division of the interval into $n+1$ subintervals by as an increasing sequence of $n$ numbers:

$$0=z_0 < \underbrace{z_1 < \dotsb < z_n} < z_{n+1} = 1$$

Define a signed partition as a partition in which each subinterval $i$ has an associated sign $\delta_i$:

$$\delta_1,\dotsc,\delta_{k+1}\in\left\{+1,-1\right\}$$

The Hobby–Rice theorem says that for every n continuously integrable functions:

$$g_1,\dotsc,g_n\colon[0,1]\longrightarrow\mathbb{R}$$

there exists a signed partition of [0,1] such that:

$$\sum_{i=1}^{n+1}\delta_i\!\int_{z_{i-1}}^{z_i} g_j(z)\,dz=0\text{ for }1\leq j\leq n.$$

(in other words: for each of the n functions, its integral over the positive subintervals equals its integral over the negative subintervals).

== Application to fair division ==
The theorem was used by Noga Alon in the context of necklace splitting in 1987.

Suppose the interval [0,1] is a cake. There are n partners and each of the n functions is a value-density function of one partner. We want to divide the cake into two parts such that all partners agree that the parts have the same value. This fair-division challenge is sometimes referred to as the consensus-halving problem. The Hobby–Rice theorem implies that this can be done with n cuts.
