= Equivariant stable homotopy theory =

In mathematics, more specifically in topology, the equivariant stable homotopy theory is a subfield of equivariant topology that studies a spectrum with group action instead of a space with group action, as in stable homotopy theory. The field has become more active recently because of its connection to algebraic K-theory.

== See also ==
- Equivariant K-theory
- G-spectrum (spectrum with an action of an (appropriate) group G)
