= Borsuk–Ulam theorem =

Theorem in topology

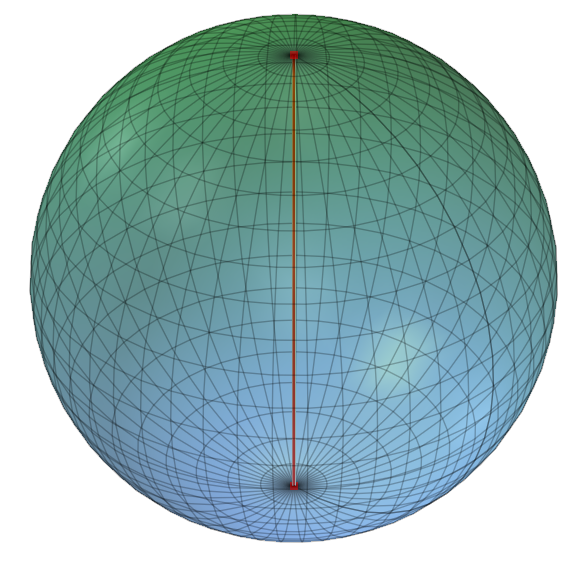
Antipodal points are opposite points on the sphere

Matching antipodal points of a squashed balloon animal

In topology, the Borsuk–Ulam theorem states that every continuous map from the sphere to the plane maps some pair of antipodal points to the same point. The theorem is named after mathematicians Karol Borsuk and Stanisław Ulam.

Informally, for a "balloon animal" (or any arbitrarily distorted shape) made out of a spherical balloon, if it is squashed into a plane (letting the air out somehow), then at least one pair of points that were opposite each other on the original sphere will be squashed onto the same point of the plane.

An analogous statement is true in higher dimensions (see below).

== General statement ==
Formally, the theorem states that every continuous function from an n-sphere into n-dimensional Euclidean space must map some pair of antipodal points to the same point. Two points on a sphere are called antipodal if they lie in exactly opposite directions from the center—like the North and South Poles.

The Borsuk–Ulam theorem has several equivalent statements in terms of odd functions. Recall that $S^n$ is the n-sphere and $B^n$ is the n-ball:

- If $g : S^n \to \R^n$ is a continuous odd function, then there exists an $x\in S^n$ such that: $g(x)=0$.
- If $g : B^n \to \R^n$ is a continuous function which is odd on $S^{n-1}$ (the boundary of $B^n$), then there exists an $x\in B^n$ such that: $g(x)=0$.

== Examples ==
More compactly: if $f: S^n \to \R^n$ is continuous then there exists an $x\in S^n$ such that: $f(-x)=f(x)$.

The case $n=1$ can be illustrated by saying that there always exist a pair of opposite points on the Earth's equator with the same temperature. The same is true for any circle. This assumes the temperature varies continuously in space, which is, however, not always the case.

The case $n=2$ is often illustrated by saying that at any moment, there is always a pair of antipodal points on the Earth's surface with equal temperatures and equal barometric pressures, assuming that both parameters vary continuously in space.

== History ==
According to Matoušek (2003, p. 25), the first historical mention of the statement of the Borsuk–Ulam theorem appears in Lyusternik & Shnirel'man (1930). The first proof was given by Karol Borsuk (1933), where the formulation of the problem was attributed to Stanisław Ulam. Since then, many alternative proofs have been found by various authors, as collected by Steinlein (1985).

== Equivalent statements ==
The following statements are equivalent to the Borsuk–Ulam theorem.

=== With odd functions ===
A function $g$ is called odd (aka antipodal or antipode-preserving) if for every $x$, $g(-x)=-g(x)$.

The Borsuk–Ulam theorem is equivalent to each of the following statements:

(1) Each continuous odd function $S^n\to \R^n$ has a zero.

(2) There is no continuous odd function $S^n \to S^{n-1}$.

Here is a proof that the Borsuk-Ulam theorem is equivalent to (1):

($\Longrightarrow$) If the theorem is correct, then it is specifically correct for odd functions, and for an odd function, $g(-x)=g(x)$ iff $g(x)=0$. Hence every odd continuous function has a zero.

($\Longleftarrow$) For every continuous function $f:S^n\to \R^n$, the following function is continuous and odd: $g(x)=f(x)-f(-x)$. If every odd continuous function has a zero, then $g$ has a zero, and therefore, $f(x)=f(-x)$.

To prove that (1) and (2) are equivalent, we use the following continuous odd maps:

- the obvious inclusion $i: S^{n-1}\to \R^n\setminus \{0\}$,
- and the radial projection map $p: \R^n\setminus \{0\} \to S^{n-1}$ given by $x \mapsto \frac{x}{|x|}$.

The proof now writes itself.

$((1) \Longrightarrow (2))$ We prove the contrapositive. If there exists a continuous odd function $f:S^n\to S^{n-1}$, then $i\circ f$ is a continuous odd function $S^n\to \R^n\setminus \{0\}$.

$((1) \Longleftarrow (2))$ Again we prove the contrapositive. If there exists a continuous odd function $f:S^n\to \R^{n}\setminus\{0\}$, then $p\circ f$ is a continuous odd function $S^n\to S^{n-1}$.

== Proofs ==
=== 1-dimensional case ===
The 1-dimensional case can easily be proved using the intermediate value theorem (IVT).

Let $g$ be the odd real-valued continuous function on a circle defined by $g(x)=f(x)-f(-x)$. Pick an arbitrary $x$. If $g(x)=0$ then we are done. Otherwise, without loss of generality, $g(x)>0.$ But $g(-x)<0.$ Hence, by the IVT, there is a point $y$ at which $g(y)=0$.

=== General case ===
==== Algebraic topological proof ====
Assume that $h: S^n \to S^{n-1}$ is an odd continuous function with $n \geq 2$ (the case $n = 1$ is treated above). Note that the case $n = 2$ can also be handled using basic covering theory.

By passing to orbits under the antipodal action, we then get an induced continuous function $h': \mathbb{RP}^n \to \mathbb{RP}^{n-1}$ between real projective spaces, and it induces an isomorphism on fundamental groups because $h$ is odd.

By the Hurewicz theorem and the universal coefficient theorem for cohomology, the induced homomorphism on cohomology with $\mathbb Z/2\mathbb Z$ coefficients,

$H^1(\mathbb{RP}^n; \mathbb Z/2\mathbb Z) \leftarrow H^1(\mathbb{RP}^{n-1}; \mathbb Z/2\mathbb Z),$

is an isomorphism. Let $a$ be the generator of $H^1(\mathbb{RP}^{n}; \mathbb Z/2\mathbb Z) \cong \mathbb Z/2\mathbb Z$ and $b$ be that of $H^1(\mathbb{RP}^{n-1}; \mathbb Z/2\mathbb Z) \cong \mathbb Z/2\mathbb Z$. Then the isomorphism sends $b$ to $a$. Therefore, the induced cohomology ring homomorphism,

$(\mathbb Z/2\mathbb Z)[a]/a^{n+1} = H^*(\mathbb{RP}^n; \mathbb Z/2\mathbb Z) \leftarrow H^*(\mathbb{RP}^{n-1}; \mathbb Z/2\mathbb Z) = (\mathbb Z/2\mathbb Z)[b]/b^n,$

sends $b^n = 0$ to $a^n \neq 0$, a contradiction.

One can also show the stronger statement that any odd map $S^{n-1} \to S^{n-1}$ has odd degree and then deduce the theorem from this result.

==== Combinatorial proof ====
The Borsuk–Ulam theorem can be proved from Tucker's lemma.

Let $g : S^n \to \R^n$ be a continuous odd function. Because g is continuous on a compact domain, it is uniformly continuous. Therefore, for every $\epsilon > 0$, there is a $\delta > 0$ such that, for every two points of $S_n$ which are within $\delta$ of each other, their images under g are within $\epsilon$ of each other.

Define a triangulation of $S_n$ with edges of length at most $\delta$. Label each vertex $v$ of the triangulation with a label $l(v)\in {\pm 1, \pm 2, \ldots, \pm n}$ in the following way:

- The absolute value of the label is the index of the coordinate with the highest absolute value of g: $|l(v)| = \arg\max_k (|g(v)_k|)$.
- The sign of the label is the sign of g at the above coordinate, so that: $l(v) = \sgn (g(v)_{|l(v)|}) |l(v)|$.

Because g is odd, the labeling is also odd: $l(-v) = -l(v)$. Hence, applying Tucker's lemma to a hemisphere of $S_n$ yields two adjacent vertices $u, v$ with opposite labels. Assume w.l.o.g. that the labels are $l(u)=1, l(v)=-1$. By the definition of l, this means that in both $g(u)$ and $g(v)$, coordinate #1 is the largest coordinate: in $g(u)$ this coordinate is positive while in $g(v)$ it is negative. By the construction of the triangulation, the distance between $g(u)$ and $g(v)$ is at most $\epsilon$, so in particular $|g(u)_1 - g(v)_1| = |g(u)_1| + |g(v)_1| \leq \epsilon$ (since $g(u)_1$ and $g(v)_1$ have opposite signs) and so $|g(u)_1| \leq \epsilon$. But since the largest coordinate of $g(u)$ is coordinate #1, this means that $|g(u)_k| \leq \epsilon$ for each $1 \leq k \leq n$. So $|g(u)| \leq c_n \epsilon$, where $c_n$ is some constant depending on $n$ and the norm $|\cdot|$ which you have chosen.

The above is true for every $\epsilon > 0$; since $S_n$ is compact there must hence be a point u in which $|g(u)|=0$.

== Corollaries ==
- No subset of $\R^n$ is homeomorphic to $S^n$
- The ham sandwich theorem: For any compact sets A_{1}, ..., A_{n} in $\R^n$ we can always find a hyperplane dividing each of them into two subsets of equal measure.

== Generalizations ==
- In the original theorem, the domain of the function f is the unit n-sphere (the boundary of the unit n-ball). In general, it is true also when the domain of f is the boundary of any open bounded symmetric subset of $\R^n$ containing the origin (Here, symmetric means that if x is in the subset then -x is also in the subset).
- More generally, if $M$ is a compact n-dimensional Riemannian manifold, and $f: M \rightarrow \mathbb{R}^n$ is continuous, there exists a pair of points x and y in $M$ such that $f(x) = f(y)$ and x and y are joined by a geodesic of length $\delta$, for any prescribed $\delta > 0$.
- Consider the function A which maps a point to its antipodal point: $A(x) = -x.$ Note that $A(A(x))=x.$ The original theorem claims that there is a point x in which $f(A(x))=f(x).$ In general, this is true also for every function A for which $A(A(x))=x.$ However, in general this is not true for other functions A.

== Equivalent results ==
There are several fixed-point theorems which come in three equivalent variants: an algebraic topology variant, a combinatorial variant and a set-covering variant. Each variant can be proved separately using totally different arguments, but each variant can also be reduced to the other variants in its row. Additionally, each result in the top row can be deduced from the one below it in the same column.

Algebraic topology	Combinatorics	Set covering
Brouwer fixed-point theorem	Sperner's lemma	Knaster–Kuratowski–Mazurkiewicz lemma
Borsuk–Ulam theorem	Tucker's lemma	Lusternik–Schnirelmann theorem

== See also ==
- Topological combinatorics
- Necklace splitting problem
- Ham sandwich theorem
- Kakutani's theorem (geometry)
- Imre Bárány
- Using the Borsuk–Ulam Theorem
