= Ravindra Bapat =

Indian mathematician

Ravindra B. Bapat
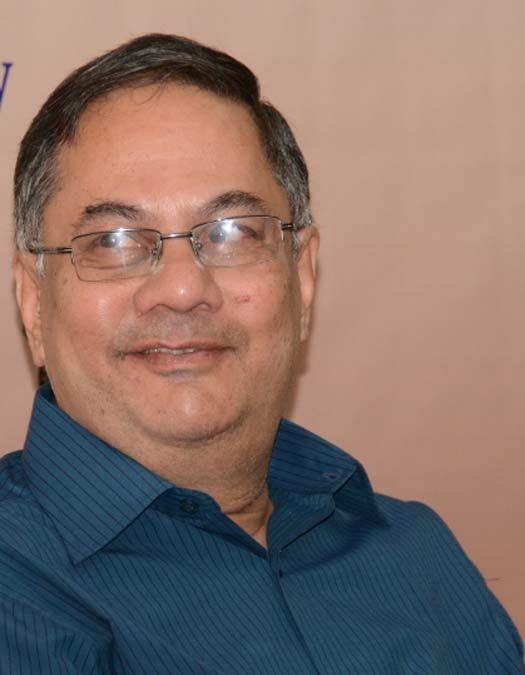
- Born: December 20, 1954
- Died: June 27, 2026 (aged 71)
- Education: University of Illinois, Chicago Indian Statistical Institute Delhi
- Awards: J C Bose Fellowship
- Scientific career
- Fields: Linear Algebra generalized inverses, matrix analysis Mathematics
- Workplaces: Indian Statistical Institute Delhi
- Doctoral advisor: T E S Raghavan

Ravindra B. Bapat is an Indian mathematician known for the Bapat–Beg theorem.

== Education ==
He obtained B.Sc. from University of Mumbai, M.Stat. from the Indian Statistical Institute, New Delhi and Ph.D. from the University of Illinois at Chicago in 1981. His research interests include major contributions to matrix inequalities, matrices in graph theory, generalized inverses, and matrix analysis.

== Career ==
In addition to the numerous research papers in the reputed journals, Bapat has written books on linear algebra published by Hindustan Book Agency, Springer, and Cambridge University Press. He has served on the editorial boards of Electronic Journal of Linear Algebra, Indian Journal of Pure and Applied Mathematics, Kerala Mathematical Association Bulletin, and Linear and Multilinear Algebra. He is national coordinator for the Mathematics Olympiad and was head of the Indian Statistical Institute, Delhi Centre from 2007 to 2011.

He is a Visiting Professor of Mathematics at Ashoka University, India.

He held the position of President of Indian Mathematical Society from 2007 to 2008.

== Fellowships and awards ==
- J.C. Bose fellowship (2009)
- Fellowship of the Indian Academy of Sciences (2000).

== Books ==
- Bapat, RB (1993). Linear Algebra and Linear Models. Springer.
- Bapat, RB, T. E. S. Raghavan (2009). Nonnegative Matrices and Applications. Cambridge University Press.
- Bapat, RB (2010). Graphs and Matrices. Springer.
- Neogy, S. K., Arup Kumar Das, R. B. Bapat (2009). Modeling, Computation and Optimization. World Scientific Publishing Co. Pte. Ltd.
