= FPP =

FPP may refer to:

== Politics ==
- Federacja Polskiej Przedsiębiorczości, a defunct political party in Poland
- First-preference plurality voting
- First Peoples Party, a defunct political party in Canada
- Patriotic Front for Progress (French: Front Patriotique pour le Progrès), a political party in the Central African Republic
- Popular Front of Potosí (Spanish: Frente Popular de Potosí), a defunct political party in Bolivia
- Fundación para el Progreso, a Chilean libertarian think tank.

== Science and medicine ==
- Fantasy prone personality
- Farnesyl pyrophosphate
- Final Parsec Problem
- Finite projective plane
- FPP scale, for rating tornado intensity
- Fundamental Physics Prize
- Floating-point processor
- Fusion pilot plant, the hypothetical first fusion power plant.

== Other uses ==
- Fiber Patch Placement (FPP)
- Fire Protection Publications, an American publisher
- First-person perspective
- Fish protein powder
- Fixed-point property
- Fixed-priority pre-emptive scheduling
- Floating power plant
- Forest Peoples Programme, a British indigenous-rights organization
- Fund Processing Passport
- Portuguese Roller Sports Federation (Portuguese: Federação Portuguesa de Patinagem)
