= Mark Krasnoselsky =

Russian mathematician

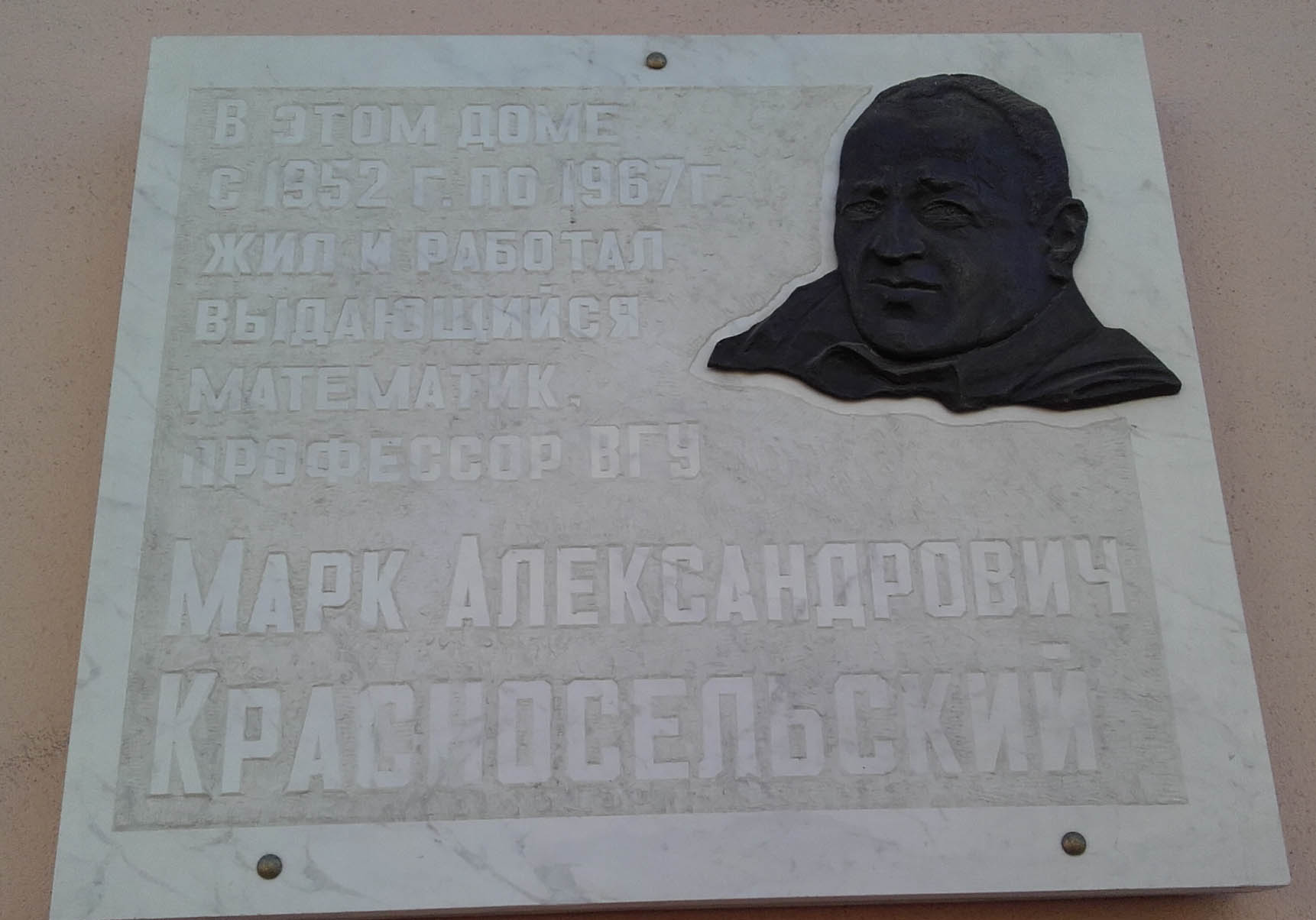
Commemorative plaque to Mark Krasnoselsky in Voronezh

Mark Aleksandrovich Krasnoselsky (Russian: Ма́рк Алекса́ндрович Красносе́льский; 27 April 1920, Starokostiantyniv – 13 February 1997, Moscow) or Mark Alexsandrovich Krasnoselskii was a Soviet and Russian mathematician renowned for his work on nonlinear functional analysis and its applications.

== Biography ==
=== Early years ===
Mark Krasnoselsky was born in Starokostiantyniv, where his father worked as a construction engineer and his mother taught in an elementary school. In 1932 the Krasnoselsky family moved to Berdiansk and in 1938 Mark entered the physico-mathematical faculty of Kyiv University, which was evacuated at the beginning of World War II to Kazakhstan where it became known as the Joint Ukrainian University.

He graduated in 1942, in the middle of the war, served four years in the Soviet Army, became Candidate in Science in 1948, with a dissertation on self-adjoint extensions of operators with nondense domains, before getting the title of Doctor in Science in 1950, with a thesis on investigations in Nonlinear Functional analysis.

=== Scientific career ===
From 1946 till 1952, Mark was a Research Fellow at the Mathematical Institute of the Ukrainian Academy of Sciences in Kyiv. From 1952 till 1967, he was Professor at Voronezh State University. He then moved to Moscow as a Senior Scientific Fellow (1967–74) and then a Head of a Laboratory (1974–90) at the Institute of Control Sciences of the Academy of Sciences of the Soviet Union in Moscow. From 1990, he worked at the Institute for Information Transmission Problems of the same Academy.

=== Death ===
He died on February 13, 1997. Buried at Khovansky cemetery in Moscow.

=== Family ===
When Mark was 18 he married Sarra Belotserkovskaya (10.09.1921–31.01.2009), they had 3 children (Veniamin, 1939; Aleksandra (Alla), 1945; Aleksandr (Sasha), 1955). Now there are 7 grandchildren and 9 great-grandchildren.

=== Distinctions ===
- Andronov Prize of the Academy of Sciences of the Soviet Union
- Humboldt Prize
- Docteur {honoris causa} of the University of Rouen in France, 1996.

== Scientific achievements ==
Krasnoselsky has authored or co-authored some three hundred papers and fourteen monographs. Nonlinear techniques are roughly classified into analytical, topological and variational methods. Mark Krasnoselsky has contributed to all three aspects in a significant way, as well as to their application to many types of integral, differential and functional equations coming from mechanics, engineering, and control theory.

Krasnoselsky was the first to investigate the functional analytical properties of fractional powers of operators, at first for self-adjoint operators and then for more general situations. His theorem on the interpolation of complete continuity of such fractional power operators has been a basic tool in the theory of partial differential equations. Of comparable importance in applications is his extensive collection of works on the theory of positive operators, in particular results in which spectral gaps were estimated. His work on integral operators and superposition operators has also found many theoretical and practical applications. A major reason for this was his desire to always find readily verifiable conditions and estimates for whatever functional properties were under consideration. This is perhaps best seen in his work on topological methods in nonlinear analysis which he developed into a universal method for finding answers to such qualitative problems such as evaluating the number of solutions, describing the structure of a solution set and conditions for the connectedness of this set, convergence of Galerkin type approximations, the bifurcation of solutions in nonlinear systems, and so on.

Krasnoselsky also presented many new general principles on solvability of a large variety of nonlinear equations, including one-sided estimates, cone stretching and contractions, fixed-point theorems for monotone operators and a combination of the Schauder fixed-point and contraction mapping theorems that was the genesis of condensing operators. He suggested a new general method for investigating degenerate extremals in variational problems and developed qualitative methods for studying critical and bifurcation parameter values based on restricted information of nonlinear equations. such as the properties of equations linearized at zero or at infinity, which have been very useful in determining the existence of bounded or periodic solutions.

After he moved to Moscow he turned his attention increasingly to discontinuous processes and operators, in connection firstly with nonlinear control systems and then with a mathematically rigorous formulation of hysteresis which encompasses most classical models of hysteresis and is now standard. He also became actively involved with the analysis of desynchronized systems and the justification of the harmonic balance method commonly used by engineers.

Krasnoselsky also introduced the concept of the Krasnoselskii genus.

== Selected works ==
1. Krasnosel'skii, M.A. (1964), Topological Methods in the Theory of Nonlinear Integral Equations, Oxford-London-New York City-Paris: Pergamon Press, 395p.
2. Krasnosel'skii, M.A.; Rutickii, Ya.B. (1961), Convex Functions and Orlicz Spaces, Groningen: P.Noordhoff Ltd, 249p.
3. Krasnosel'skii, M.A. (1964), Positive Solutions of Operator Equations, Groningen: P.Noordhoff Ltd, pp. 381 pp
4. Krasnosel'skii, M.A.; Perov, A.I.; Povolockii, A.I.; Zabreiko, P.P. (1966), Plane Vector Fields, New York City: Academic Press, 242p.
5. Krasnosel'skii, M.A.; Gorin, E.A.; Vilenkin, N.Ya.; Kostyuchenko, A.G.; Maslov, V.P.; Mityagin, B.S.; Petunin, Yu.I.; Rutitskij, Ya.B.; Sobolev, V.I.; Stetsenko, V.Ya.; Faddeev, L.D.; Tsitlanadze, E.S. (1972), Functional Analysis, Groningen: Wolters-Noordhoff Publ., 379p.
6. Krasnosel'skii, M.A. (1968), The Operator of Translation along the Trajectories of Differential Equations, Providence: American Mathematical Society, Translation of Mathematical Monographs, 19, 294p.
7. Krasnosel'skii, M.A.; Pustylnik, E.I.; Sobolevskii, P.E.; Zabreiko, P.P. (1976), Integral Operators in Spaces of Summable Functions, Leyden: Noordhoff International Publishing, 520 p.
8. Krasnosel'skii, M.A.; Koshelev, A.I.; Mikhlin, S.G.; Rakovshchik, L.S.; Stet'senko, V.Ya.; Zabreiko, P.P. (1975), Integral Equations, Leyden: Noordhoff International Publishing, 443p.
9. Krasnosel'skii, M.A.; Rutitcki, Ja.B.; Stecenko, V.Ja.; Vainikko, G.M.; Zabreiko, P.P. (1972), Approximate Solutions of Operator Equations, Groningen: Walters - Noordhoff Publ., 484p.
10. Krasnosel'skii, M.A.; Burd, V.S.; Kolesov, Ju.S. (1973), Nonlinear Almost Periodic Oscillations, New York City: John Wiley, 366p.
11. Krasnosel'skii, M.A.; Zabreiko, P.P. (1984), Geometrical Methods of Nonlinear Analysis, Berlin-Heidelberg-New York City-Tokyo: Springer Verlag, Grundlehren Der Mathematischen Wissenschaften, A Series of Comprehensive Studies in Mathematics, 263, 409p.
12. Krasnosel'skii, M.A.; Pokrovskii, A.V. (1989), Systems with Hysteresis, Berlin-Heidelberg-New York City-Paris-Tokyo: Springer Verlag, 410p.
13. Krasnosel'skii, M.A.; Lifshits, Je.A.; Sobolev, A.V. (1990), Positive Linear Systems: The method of positive operators, Sigma Series in Applied Mathematics, vol. 5, Berlin: Helderman Verlag, pp. 354 pp
14. Asarin, E.A.; Kozyakin, V.S.; Krasnosel'skii, M.A.; Kuznetsov, N.A. (1992), Asynchronous system stability analysis, Moscow: Nauka, 408p., [Russian].
