= Coincidence point =

Generalization of a fixed point

In mathematics, a coincidence point (or simply coincidence) of two functions is a point in their common domain having the same image.

Formally, given two functions
$$f,g \colon X \rightarrow Y$$
we say that a point x in X is a coincidence point of f and g if f(x) = g(x).

Coincidence theory (the study of coincidence points) is, in most settings, a generalization of fixed point theory, the study of points x with f(x) = x. Fixed point theory is the special case obtained from the above by letting X = Y and taking g to be the identity function.

Just as fixed point theory has its fixed-point theorems, there are theorems that guarantee the existence of coincidence points for pairs of functions. Notable among them, in the setting of manifolds, is the Lefschetz coincidence theorem, which is typically known only in its special case formulation for fixed points.

Coincidence points, like fixed points, are today studied using many tools from mathematical analysis and topology. An equaliser is a generalization of the coincidence set.

== See also ==
- Incidence (geometry)
- Intersection (geometry)
