= Fixed-point theorems in infinite-dimensional spaces =

Theorems generalizing the Brouwer fixed-point theorem

In mathematics, a number of fixed-point theorems in infinite-dimensional spaces generalise the Brouwer fixed-point theorem. They have applications, for example, to the proof of existence theorems for partial differential equations.

The first result in the field was the Schauder fixed-point theorem, proved in 1930 by Juliusz Schauder (a previous result in a different vein, the Banach fixed-point theorem for contraction mappings in complete metric spaces was proved in 1922). Quite a number of further results followed. One way in which fixed-point theorems of this kind have had a larger influence on mathematics as a whole has been that one approach is to try to carry over methods of algebraic topology, first proved for finite simplicial complexes, to spaces of infinite dimension. For example, the research of Jean Leray who founded sheaf theory came out of efforts to extend Schauder's work.

Schauder fixed-point theorem: Let C be a nonempty closed convex subset of a Banach space V. If f : C → C is continuous with a compact image, then f has a fixed point.

Tikhonov (Tychonoff) fixed-point theorem: Let V be a locally convex topological vector space. For any nonempty compact convex set X in V, any continuous function f : X → X has a fixed point.

Browder fixed-point theorem: Let K be a nonempty closed bounded convex set in a uniformly convex Banach space. Then any non-expansive function f : K → K has a fixed point. (A function $f$ is called non-expansive if $\|f(x)-f(y)\|\leq \|x-y\|$ for each $x$ and $y$.)

Other results include the Markov–Kakutani fixed-point theorem (1936-1938) and the Ryll-Nardzewski fixed-point theorem (1967) for continuous affine self-mappings of compact convex sets, as well as the Earle–Hamilton fixed-point theorem (1968) for holomorphic self-mappings of open domains. Also, Aniki & Rauf (2019) presented some interesting results on the stability of partially ordered metric spaces for coupled fixed point iteration procedures for mixed monotone mappings.

Kakutani fixed-point theorem: Every correspondence that maps a compact convex subset of a locally convex space into itself with a closed graph and convex nonempty images has a fixed point.

== See also ==
- Topological degree theory
