= List of limits =

This is a list of limits for common functions such as elementary functions. In this article, the terms a, b and c are constants with respect to x.

== Limits for general functions ==
=== Definitions of limits and related concepts ===
$\lim_{x \to c} f(x) = L$ if and only if $\forall \varepsilon>0\ \exists \delta>0 : 0 < |x-c| < \delta \implies |f(x)-L| < \varepsilon$. This is the (ε, δ)-definition of limit.

The limit superior and limit inferior of a sequence are defined as $\limsup_{n \to \infty} x_n = \lim_{n \to \infty} \left(\sup_{m \geq n} x_m\right)$ and $\liminf_{n \to \infty} x_n = \lim_{n \to \infty}\left(\inf_{m \geq n} x_m\right)$.

A function, $f(x)$, is said to be continuous at a point, c, if
$$\lim_{x \to c} f(x) = f(c).$$

=== Operations on a single known limit ===
If $\lim_{x \to c} f(x) = L$ then:

- $\lim_{x \to c} \, [f(x) \pm a] = L \pm a$
- $\lim_{x \to c} \, a f(x) = a L$
- $\lim_{x \to c} \frac{1}{f(x)}= \frac1L$ if L is not equal to 0.
- $\lim_{x \to c} \, f(x)^n = L^n$ if n is a positive integer
- $\lim_{x \to c} \, f(x)^{1 \over n} = L^{1 \over n}$ if n is a positive integer, and if n is even, then L > 0.

In general, if g(x) is continuous at L and $\lim_{x \to c} f(x) = L$ then

- $\lim_{x \to c} g\left(f(x)\right) =g(L)$

=== Operations on two known limits ===
If $\lim_{x \to c} f(x) = L_1$ and $\lim_{x \to c} g(x) = L_2$ then:

- $\lim_{x \to c} \, [f(x) \pm g(x)] = L_1 \pm L_2$
- $\lim_{x \to c} \, [f(x)g(x)] = L_1 \cdot L_2$
- $\lim_{x \to c} \frac{f(x)}{g(x)} = \frac{L_1}{L_2} \qquad \text{ if } L_2 \ne 0$

=== Limits involving derivatives or infinitesimal changes ===
In these limits, the infinitesimal change $h$ is often denoted $\Delta x$ or $\delta x$. If $f(x)$ is differentiable at $x$,

- $\lim_{h \to 0} {f(x+h)-f(x)\over h} = f'(x)$. This is the definition of the derivative. All differentiation rules can also be reframed as rules involving limits. For example, if g(x) is differentiable at x,
  - $\lim_{h \to 0} {f\circ g(x+h)-f\circ g(x)\over h}=f'[g(x)]g'(x)$. This is the chain rule.
  - $\lim_{h \to 0} {f(x+h)g(x+h)-f(x)g(x)\over h}=f'(x)g(x)+f(x)g'(x)$. This is the product rule.
- $\lim_{h \to 0} \left(\frac{f(x+h)}{f(x)}\right)^{1/h} = \exp\left(\frac{f'(x)}{f(x)}\right)$
- $\lim_{h \to 0} {\left({f(e^h x)\over{f(x)}}\right)^{1/h} } = \exp\left(\frac{x f'(x)}{f(x)}\right)$

If $f(x)$ and $g(x)$ are differentiable on an open interval containing c, except possibly c itself, and $\lim_{x \to c} f(x) = \lim_{x \to c} g(x) = 0 \text{ or } \pm\infty$, L'Hôpital's rule can be used:

- $\lim_{x \to c} \frac{f(x)}{g(x)} = \lim_{x \to c} \frac{f'(x)}{g'(x)}$

=== Inequalities ===
If $f(x)\leq g(x)$ for all x in an interval that contains c, except possibly c itself, and the limit of $f(x)$ and $g(x)$ both exist at c, then
$$\lim_{x\to c}f(x)\leq \lim_{x\to c}g(x)$$

If $\lim_{x \to c} f(x) = \lim_{x \to c} h(x) = L$ and $f(x)\leq g(x)\leq h(x)$ for all x in an open interval that contains c, except possibly c itself,
$$\lim_{x \to c} g(x) = L.$$
This is known as the squeeze theorem. This applies even in the cases that f(x) and g(x) take on different values at c, or are discontinuous at c.

== Polynomials and functions of the form x^{a} ==
- $\lim_{x \to c} a = a$

=== Polynomials in x ===
- $\lim_{x \to c} x = c$
- $\lim_{x \to c} (ax + b) = ac + b$
- $\lim_{x \to c} x^n = c^n$ if n is a positive integer
- $$\lim_{x\to\infty} x/a = \begin{cases}
\infty, & a > 0 \\
\text{does not exist}, & a = 0 \\
-\infty, & a < 0 \end{cases}$$

In general, if $p(x)$ is a polynomial then, by the continuity of polynomials,
$$\lim_{x \to c} p(x) = p(c)$$
This is also true for rational functions, as they are continuous on their domains.

=== Functions of the form x^{a} ===
- $\lim_{x\to c}x^a=c^a.$ In particular,
  - $$\lim_{x\to\infty}x^a=\begin{cases} \infty, & a > 0 \\ 1, & a = 0 \\ 0, & a < 0 \end{cases}$$
- $\lim_{x\to c}x^{1/a}=c^{1/a}$. In particular,
  - $\lim_{x\to\infty} x^{1/a}=\lim_{x\to\infty}\sqrt[a]{x}= \infty \text{ for any } a > 0$
- $\lim_{x \to 0^+} x^{-n} =\lim_{x \to 0^+} \frac{1}{x^n}= +\infty$
- $$\lim_{x \to 0^-} x^{-n} =\lim_{x \to 0^-} \frac{1}{x^n} =\begin{cases}
-\infty, & \text{if } n \text{ is odd} \\
+\infty, & \text{if } n \text{ is even}
\end{cases}$$
- $\lim_{x\to\infty} ax^{-1}=\lim_{x\to\infty}a/x=0 \text{ for any real }a$

== Exponential functions ==
=== Functions of the form a^{g(x)} ===
- $\lim_{x \to c} e^{x} = e^c$, due to the continuity of $e^{x}$
- $$\lim_{x\to\infty}a^x=\begin{cases} \infty, & a > 1 \\ 1, & a = 1 \\ 0, & 0 < a < 1 \end{cases}$$
- $$\lim_{x\to\infty}a^{-x}=\begin{cases} 0, & a > 1 \\ 1, & a = 1 \\ \infty, & 0 < a < 1 \end{cases}$$
- $$\lim_{x\to\infty}\sqrt[x]{a}=\lim_{x\to\infty}{a}^{1/x}=\begin{cases}
1, & a > 0 \\
0, & a = 0 \\
\text{does not exist}, & a < 0
\end{cases}$$

=== Functions of the form x^{g(x)} ===
- $\lim_{x\to\infty}\sqrt[x]{x}=\lim_{x\to\infty}{x}^{1/x}=1$

=== Functions of the form f(x)^{g(x)} ===
- $\lim_{x\to+\infty} \left( \frac{x}{x+k}\right)^x=e^{-k}$
- $\lim_{x\to 0} \left(1+x\right)^\frac{1}{x}=e$
- $\lim_{x\to 0} \left(1+kx\right)^\frac{m}{x}=e^{mk}$
- $\lim_{x\to+\infty} \left(1+\frac{1}{x}\right)^x=e$
- $\lim_{x\to+\infty} \left(1-\frac{1}{x}\right)^x=\frac{1}{e}$
- $\lim_{x\to+\infty} \left(1+\frac{k}{x}\right)^{mx}=e^{mk}$
- $\lim_{x \to 0} \left(1+ a \left({e^{-x} - 1}\right)\right)^{-\frac{1}{x}} = e^{a}$. This limit can be derived from this limit.

=== Sums, products and composites ===
- $\lim_{x \to 0} x e^{-x} = 0$
- $\lim_{x \to \infty} x e^{-x} = 0$
- $\lim_{x \to 0} \left( \frac{a^x - 1}{x} \right) = \ln{a},$ for all positive a.
- $\lim_{x \to 0} \left( \frac{e^x - 1}{x} \right) = 1$
- $\lim_{x \to 0} \left( \frac{e^{ax} - 1}{x} \right) = a$

== Logarithmic functions ==
=== Natural logarithms ===
- $\lim_{x \to c} \ln{x} = \ln c$, due to the continuity of $\ln {x}$. In particular,
  - $\lim_{x\to0^+}\log x=-\infty$
  - $\lim_{x\to\infty}\log x=\infty$
- $\lim_{x\to1}\frac{\ln(x)}{x-1}=1$
- $\lim_{x\to0}\frac{\ln(x+1)}{x}=1$
- $\lim_{x \to 0} \frac{-\ln\left(1+ a \left({e^{-x} - 1}\right)\right)}{x} = a$. This limit follows from L'Hôpital's rule.
- $\lim_{x \to 0} x\ln x = 0$, hence $\lim_{x \to 0} x^x = 1$
- $\lim_{x \to \infty} \frac{\ln x}{x} = 0$

=== Logarithms to arbitrary bases ===
For b > 1,

- $\lim_{x \to 0^+} \log_b x = -\infty$
- $\lim_{x \to \infty} \log_b x = \infty$

For b < 1,

- $\lim_{x \to 0^+} \log_b x = \infty$
- $\lim_{x \to \infty} \log_b x = -\infty$

Both cases can be generalized to:

- $\lim_{x \to 0^+} \log_b x = -F(b)\infty$
- $\lim_{x \to \infty} \log_b x = F(b)\infty$

where $F(x) = 2H(x-1) - 1$ and $H(x)$ is the Heaviside step function

== Trigonometric functions ==
If $x$ is expressed in radians:

- $\lim_{x \to a} \sin x = \sin a$
- $\lim_{x \to a} \cos x = \cos a$

These limits both follow from the continuity of sin and cos.

- $\lim_{x \to 0} \frac{\sin x}{x} = 1$. Or, in general,
  - $\lim_{x \to 0} \frac{\sin ax}{ax} = 1$, for a not equal to 0.
  - $\lim_{x \to 0} \frac{\sin ax}{x} = a$
  - $\lim_{x \to 0} \frac{\sin ax}{bx} = \frac{a}{b}$, for b not equal to 0.
- $\lim_{x \to \infty} x\sin \left(\frac1x\right) = 1$
- $\lim_{x \to 0} \frac{1-\cos x}{x} = \lim_{x \to 0} \frac{\cos x - 1}{x} = 0$
- $\lim_{x \to 0} \frac{1-\cos x}{x^2} = \frac{1}{2}$
- $\lim_{x \to n^\pm} \tan \left(\pi x + \frac{\pi}{2}\right) = \mp\infty$, for integer n.
- $\lim_{x \to 0} \frac{\tan x}{x} = 1$. Or, in general,
  - $\lim_{x \to 0} \frac{\tan ax}{ax} = 1$, for a not equal to 0.
  - $\lim_{x \to 0} \frac{\tan ax}{bx} = \frac{a}{b}$, for b not equal to 0.
- $\lim_{n\to \infty }\ \underbrace{\sin \sin \cdots \sin(x_0)}_n= 0$, where x_{0} is an arbitrary real number.
- $\lim_{n\to \infty }\ \underbrace{\cos \cos \cdots \cos(x_0)}_n= d$, where d is the Dottie number. x_{0} can be any arbitrary real number.

== Sums ==
In general, any infinite series is the limit of its partial sums. For example, an analytic function is the limit of its Taylor series, within its radius of convergence.

- $\lim_{n \to \infty} \sum_{k=1}^n\frac{1}{k}=\infty$. This is known as the harmonic series.
- $\lim_{n\to\infty}\left( \sum_{k=1}^{n}\frac{1}{k}-\log n\right)=\gamma$. This is the Euler Mascheroni constant.

== Notable special limits ==
- $\lim_{n\to\infty} \frac{n}{\sqrt[n]{n!}}=e$
- $\lim_{n\to\infty}\left(n!\right)^{1/n}=\infty$. This can be proven by considering the inequality $e^x \geq \frac{x^n}{n!}$ at $x = n$.
- $\lim_{n\to \infty }\, 2^{n} \underbrace{\sqrt{2-\sqrt{2+\sqrt{2+ \dots +\sqrt{2}}}}}_n= \pi$. This can be derived from Viète's formula for π.

== Limiting behavior ==
=== Asymptotic equivalences ===
Asymptotic equivalences, $f(x)\sim g(x)$, are true if $\lim_{x\to\infty}\frac{f(x)}{g(x)}=1$. Therefore, they can also be reframed as limits. Some notable asymptotic equivalences include

- $\lim_{x\to\infty}\frac{x/\ln x}{\pi(x)}=1$, due to the prime number theorem, $\pi(x)\sim\frac{x}{\ln x}$, where π(x) is the prime counting function.
- $\lim_{n\to\infty}\frac{\sqrt{2\pi n}\left(\frac{n}{e}\right)^n}{n!}=1$, due to Stirling's approximation, $n! \sim \sqrt{2\pi n}\left(\frac{n}{e}\right)^n$.

=== Big O notation ===
The behaviour of functions described by Big O notation can also be described by limits. For example

- $f(x)\in\mathcal{O}(g(x))$ if $\limsup_{x\to\infty} \frac{|f(x)|}{g(x)}<\infty$
