= Fixed-point index =

Concept in Nielsen theory

In mathematics, the fixed-point index is a concept in topological fixed-point theory, and in particular Nielsen theory. The fixed-point index can be thought of as a multiplicity measurement of fixed points.

The index can be easily defined in the setting of complex analysis: Let f(z) be a holomorphic mapping on the complex plane, and let z_{0} be a fixed point of f. Then the function f(z) − z is holomorphic, and has an isolated zero at z_{0}. We define the fixed-point index of f at z_{0}, denoted i(f, z_{0}), to be the multiplicity of the zero of the function f(z) − z at the point z_{0}.

In real Euclidean space, the fixed-point index is defined as follows: If x_{0} is an isolated fixed point of f, then let g be the function defined by

$$g(x) = \frac{x - f(x)}{|| x - f(x) ||}.$$

Then g has an isolated singularity at x_{0}, and maps the boundary of some deleted neighborhood of x_{0} to the unit sphere. We define i(f, x_{0}) to be the Brouwer degree of the mapping induced by g on some suitably chosen small sphere around x_{0}.

== The Lefschetz–Hopf theorem ==
The importance of the fixed-point index is largely due to its role in the Lefschetz–Hopf theorem, which states:

$$\sum_{x \in \mathrm{Fix}(f)} \mathrm{ind}(f,x) = \Lambda_f,$$

where Fix(f) is the set of fixed points of f, and Λ_{f} is the Lefschetz number of f.

Since the quantity on the left-hand side of the above is clearly zero when f has no fixed points, the Lefschetz–Hopf theorem trivially implies the Lefschetz fixed-point theorem.
