= Holomorphic Lefschetz fixed-point formula =

Theorem about complex manifolds

In mathematics, the Holomorphic Lefschetz formula is an analogue for complex manifolds of the Lefschetz fixed-point formula that relates a sum over the fixed points of a holomorphic vector field of a compact complex manifold to a sum over its Dolbeault cohomology groups.

== Statement ==
If f is an automorphism of a compact complex manifold M with isolated fixed points, then

$$\sum_{f(p)=p}\frac{1}{\det (1-A_p)} = \sum_q(-1)^q\operatorname{trace}(f^*|H^{0,q}_{\overline\partial}(M))$$

where

- The sum is over the fixed points p of f
- The linear transformation A_{p} is the action induced by f on the holomorphic tangent space at p

== See also ==
- Bott residue formula
