= Atiyah–Bott fixed-point theorem =

Fixed-point theorem for smooth manifolds

In mathematics, the Atiyah–Bott fixed-point theorem, proven by Michael Atiyah and Raoul Bott in the 1960s, is a general form of the Lefschetz fixed-point theorem for smooth manifolds M, which uses an elliptic complex on M. This is a system of elliptic differential operators on vector bundles, generalizing the de Rham complex constructed from smooth differential forms which appears in the original Lefschetz fixed-point theorem.

== Formulation ==
The idea is to find the correct replacement for the Lefschetz number, which in the classical result is an integer counting the correct contribution of a fixed point of a smooth mapping

$f\colon M \to M.$

Intuitively, the fixed points are the points of intersection of the graph of f with the diagonal (graph of the identity mapping) in $M\times M$, and the Lefschetz number thereby becomes an intersection number. The Atiyah–Bott theorem is an equation in which the LHS must be the outcome of a global topological (homological) calculation, and the RHS a sum of the local contributions at fixed points of f.

Counting codimensions in $M\times M$, a transversality assumption for the graph of f and the diagonal should ensure that the fixed point set is zero-dimensional. Assuming M a closed manifold should ensure then that the set of intersections is finite, yielding a finite summation as the RHS of the expected formula. Further data needed relates to the elliptic complex of vector bundles $E_j$, namely a bundle map

$$\varphi_j \colon f^{-1}(E_j) \to E_j$$

for each j, such that the resulting maps on sections give rise to an endomorphism of an elliptic complex $T$. Such an endomorphism $T$ has Lefschetz number

$$L(T),$$

which by definition is the alternating sum of its traces on each graded part of the homology of the elliptic complex.

The form of the theorem is then

$$L(T)  =  \sum_x \left(\sum_j (-1)^j \mathrm{trace}\, \varphi_{j,x}\right)/\delta(x).$$

Here trace $\varphi_{j,x}$ means the trace of $\varphi_{j}$ at a fixed point x of f, and $\delta(x)$ is the determinant of the endomorphism $I -Df$ at x, with $Df$ the derivative of f (the non-vanishing of this is a consequence of transversality). The outer summation is over the fixed points x, and the inner summation over the index j in the elliptic complex.

Specializing the Atiyah–Bott theorem to the de Rham complex of smooth differential forms yields the original Lefschetz fixed-point formula. A famous application of the Atiyah–Bott theorem is a simple proof of the Weyl character formula in the theory of Lie groups.

== History ==
The early history of this result is entangled with that of the Atiyah–Singer index theorem. There was other input, as is suggested by the alternate name Woods Hole fixed-point theorem that was used in the past (referring properly to the case of isolated fixed points). A 1964 meeting at Woods Hole brought together a varied group:

Eichler started the interaction between fixed-point theorems and automorphic forms. Shimura played an important part in this development by explaining this to Bott at the Woods Hole conference in 1964.

As Atiyah puts it:

[at the conference]...Bott and I learnt of a conjecture of Shimura concerning a generalization of the Lefschetz formula for holomorphic maps. After much effort we convinced ourselves that there should be a general formula of this type [...]; .

and they were led to a version for elliptic complexes.

In the recollection of William Fulton, who was also present at the conference, the first to produce a proof was Jean-Louis Verdier.

== Proofs ==
In the context of algebraic geometry, the statement applies for smooth and proper varieties over an algebraically closed field. This variant of the Atiyah–Bott fixed point formula was proved by Kondyrev & Prikhodko (2018) by expressing both sides of the formula as appropriately chosen categorical traces.

== See also ==
- Bott residue formula
