= Complex geodesic =

In mathematics, a complex geodesic is a generalization of the notion of geodesic to complex spaces.

== Definition ==
Let (X, || ||) be a complex Banach space and let B be the open unit ball in X. Let Δ denote the open unit disc in the complex plane C, thought of as the Poincaré disc model for 2-dimensional real/1-dimensional complex hyperbolic geometry. Let the Poincaré metric ρ on Δ be given by

$$\rho (a, b) = \tanh^{-1} \frac{| a - b |}{|1 - \bar{a} b |}$$

and denote the corresponding Carathéodory metric on B by d. Then a holomorphic function f : Δ → B is said to be a complex geodesic if

$$d(f(w), f(z)) = \rho (w, z) \,$$

for all points w and z in Δ.

== Properties and examples of complex geodesics ==
- Given u ∈ X with ||u|| = 1, the map f : Δ → B given by f(z) = zu is a complex geodesic.
- Geodesics can be reparametrized: if f is a complex geodesic and g ∈ Aut(Δ) is a bi-holomorphic automorphism of the disc Δ, then f o g is also a complex geodesic. In fact, any complex geodesic f_{1} with the same image as f (i.e., f_{1}(Δ) = f(Δ)) arises as such a reparametrization of f.
- If

$$d(f(0), f(z)) = \rho (0, z)$$

for some z ≠ 0, then f is a complex geodesic.

- If

$$\alpha (f(0), f'(0)) = 1,$$

where α denotes the Caratheodory length of a tangent vector, then f is a complex geodesic.
