= Bott residue formula =

Theorem about complex manifolds

In mathematics, the Bott residue formula, introduced by Bott (1967), describes a sum over the fixed points of a holomorphic vector field of a compact complex manifold.

== Statement ==
If v is a holomorphic vector field on a compact complex manifold M, then

$$\sum_{v(p)=0}\frac{P(A_p)}{\det A_p} = \int_M P(i\Theta/2\pi)$$

where

- The sum is over the fixed points p of the vector field v
- The linear transformation A_{p} is the action induced by v on the holomorphic tangent space at p
- P is an invariant polynomial function of matrices of degree dim(M)
- Θ is a curvature matrix of the holomorphic tangent bundle

== See also ==
- Atiyah–Bott fixed-point theorem
- Holomorphic Lefschetz fixed-point formula
