= Equaliser (mathematics) =

Set of arguments where two or more functions have the same value

In mathematics, an equaliser is a set of arguments where two or more functions have equal values. An equaliser is the solution set of an equation. In certain contexts, a difference kernel is the equaliser of exactly two functions.

== Definitions ==
Let X and Y be sets. Let f and g be functions, both from X to Y. Then the equaliser of f and g is the set of elements x of X such that f(x) equals g(x) in Y. Symbolically:

$$\operatorname{Eq}(f, g) := \{x \in X \mid f(x) = g(x)\}.$$

The equaliser may be denoted Eq(f, g) or a variation on that theme (such as with lowercase letters "eq"). In informal contexts, the notation {f = g} is common.

The definition above used two functions f and g, but there is no need to restrict to only two functions, or even to only finitely many functions. In general, if F is a set of functions from X to Y, then the equaliser of the members of F is the set of elements x of X such that, given any two members f and g of F, f(x) equals g(x) in Y. Symbolically:

$$\operatorname{Eq}(\mathcal{F}) := \{x \in X \mid \forall f,g \in \mathcal{F}, \; f(x) = g(x)\}.$$

This equaliser may be written as Eq(f, g, h, ...) if $\mathcal{F}$ is the set {f, g, h, ...}. In the latter case, one may also find {f = g = h = ···} in informal contexts.

As a degenerate case of the general definition, let F be a singleton {f}. Since f(x) always equals itself, the equaliser must be the entire domain X. As an even more degenerate case, let F be the empty set. Then the equaliser is again the entire domain X, since the universal quantification in the definition is vacuously true.

== Difference kernels ==
A binary equaliser (that is, an equaliser of just two functions) is also called a difference kernel. This may also be denoted DiffKer(f, g), Ker(f, g), or Ker(f − g). The last notation shows where this terminology comes from, and why it is most common in the context of abstract algebra: The difference kernel of f and g is simply the kernel of the difference f − g. Furthermore, the kernel of a single function f can be reconstructed as the difference kernel Eq(f, 0), where 0 is the constant function with value zero.

Of course, all of this presumes an algebraic context where the kernel of a function is the preimage of zero under that function; that is not true in all situations. However, the terminology "difference kernel" has no other meaning.

== In category theory ==
Equalisers can be defined by a universal property, which allows the notion to be generalised from the category of sets to arbitrary categories.

In the general context, X and Y are objects, while f and g are morphisms from X to Y. These objects and morphisms form a diagram in the category in question, and the equaliser is the limit of that diagram.

In more explicit terms, the equaliser consists of an object E and a morphism eq : E → X satisfying $f \circ eq = g \circ eq$, and such that, given any object O and morphism m : O → X, if $f \circ m = g \circ m$, then there exists a unique morphism u : O → E such that $eq \circ u = m$.

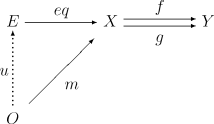

A morphism $m:O \rightarrow X$ is said to equalise $f$ and $g$ if $f \circ m = g \circ m$.

In any universal algebraic category, including the categories where difference kernels are used, as well as the category of sets itself, the object E can always be taken to be the ordinary notion of equaliser, and the morphism eq can in that case be taken to be the inclusion function of E as a subset of X.

The generalisation of this to more than two morphisms is straightforward; simply use a larger diagram with more morphisms in it. The degenerate case of only one morphism is also straightforward; then eq can be any isomorphism from an object E to X.

The correct diagram for the degenerate case with no morphisms is slightly subtle: one might initially draw the diagram as consisting of the objects X and Y and no morphisms. This is incorrect, however, since the limit of such a diagram is the product of X and Y, rather than the equaliser. (And indeed products and equalisers are different concepts: the set-theoretic definition of product doesn't agree with the set-theoretic definition of the equaliser mentioned above, hence they are actually different.) Instead, the appropriate insight is that every equaliser diagram is fundamentally concerned with X, including Y only because Y is the codomain of morphisms which appear in the diagram. With this view, we see that if there are no morphisms involved, Y does not make an appearance and the equaliser diagram consists of X alone. The limit of this diagram is then any isomorphism between E and X.

It can be proved that any equaliser in any category is a monomorphism. If the converse holds in a given category, then that category is said to be regular (in the sense of monomorphisms). More generally, a regular monomorphism in any category is any morphism m that is an equaliser of some set of morphisms. Some authors require more strictly that m be a binary equaliser, that is an equaliser of exactly two morphisms. However, if the category in question is complete, then both definitions agree.

The notion of difference kernel also makes sense in a category-theoretic context. The terminology "difference kernel" is common throughout category theory for any binary equaliser. In the case of a preadditive category (a category enriched over the category of Abelian groups), the term "difference kernel" may be interpreted literally, since subtraction of morphisms makes sense. That is, Eq(f, g) = Ker(f - g), where Ker denotes the category-theoretic kernel.

Any category with fibre products (pullbacks) and products has equalisers.

=== Category of topological spaces (Top) ===
In Top where objects are topological spaces and morphisms are continuous maps, the equaliser of two continuous maps $f, g : X \rightarrow Y$ retains the underlying set $E = \{x \in X | f(x) = g(x)\}$, but endows it with the subspace topology inherited from $X$. The inclusion $e : E \rightarrow X$ is continuous, and the universal property is preserved: any continuous map $h : Z \rightarrow X$ coalescing with $f$ and $g$ factors uniquely through $e$. This exemplifies the principle that topological structure, when subordinate to the equaliser's defining condition, is inherited without contradiction.

== See also ==
- Coequaliser, the dual notion, obtained by reversing the arrows in the equaliser definition.
- Coincidence theory, a topological approach to equaliser sets in topological spaces.
- Pullback, a special limit that can be constructed from equalisers and products.
