= Krasnoselskii genus =

In nonlinear functional analysis, the Krasnoselskii genus generalizes the notion of dimension for vector spaces. The Krasnoselskii genus of a linear space $A$ is the smallest natural number $n$ for which there exists a continuous odd function of the form $f : A \to \R^n \setminus {0}$. The genus was introduced by Mark Aleksandrovich Krasnoselskii in 1964, and an equivalent definition was provided by Charles Coffman in 1969.

== Krasnoselskii Genus ==
We follow the definition given by Coffman.

Let

- $E$ be a Banach space,
- $\mathcal{A} = \{A \subset E : A \text{ closed},; A = -A\}$ be the collection of symmetric closed subsets of $E$,
- $C(A,\R^n)$ the space of continuous functions $A \to \R^n$.

For $A \in \mathcal{A}$ define the set

$$K_A =\{ n \in \N : \exists f \in C(A,\R^n \setminus {0}),; f(-x) = -f(x)\}$$

Then the Krasnoselskii genus of $A$ is defined as

$$\gamma(A)=\begin{cases}\inf K_A &\text{if }K_A\neq \emptyset,\\
\infty &\text{if }K_A=\emptyset, \\
0 & \text{if } A=\emptyset.\end{cases}$$

In other words, if $\gamma(A) = n$ then there exists a continuous odd function $\varphi : A \to \R^n$ such that $0 \notin \varphi(A)$. Moreover $n$ is the minimal possible dimension, i.e. there exists no such function $\theta : A \to \R^d$ with $d < n$.

=== Properties ===
- Let $\Omega \subset \R^n$ be a bounded symmetric neighborhood of $0$ in $\R^n$. Then the genus of its boundary is $\gamma(\partial \Omega) = n$.
- For $A, B \in \mathcal{A}$, the following holds:
1. If there exists an odd function $f \in C(A, B)$, then $\gamma(A) \leq \gamma(B)$.
2. If $A \subset B$, then $\gamma(A) \leq \gamma(B)$.
3. If there exists an odd homeomorphism between $A$ and $B$, then $\gamma(A) = \gamma(B)$.

Combining these statements, it follows immediately that if there exists an odd homeomorphism between $A$ and $\partial \Omega$ then $\gamma(A) = n$.
