= Fund Processing Passport =

Standard document for funds

The Fund Processing Passport (FPP), developed by the European Fund and Asset Management Association (EFAMA), is a standardised document with all the key "operational" information that fund promoters should provide on their investment funds in order to facilitate their trading.

The information covered includes ISIN code, contact details, subscriptions/redemptions rules, settlement details, and cut off times amongst others.

== History ==
In 2003, EFAMA established the Fund Processing Standardisation Group (FPSG) with the aim of improving efficiency in the cross-border processing of fund units and shares across Europe. The FPSG published its first set of recommendations in February 2005. An updated report was published in September 2008. This report consolidates the 2005 recommendations and extends them in three service areas: holding and transaction reporting, commission handling and settlement cycles.

In early 2007, EFAMA published the version 1.0 of the Fund Processing Passport, which had been outlined in the FPSG recommendations of 2005. To highlight the rationale for the FPP, EFAMA published a brochure in June 2007. In May 2008, EFAMA released a revised and improved version of the FPP, together with an updated version of its User Guide and formatting guidelines (see "Fund Processing Passport User Guide", version 2.0, Excel file)

EFAMA strongly believes that the FPSG recommendations, if embraced by the industry, will serve to converge towards industry-wide standards, thereby removing an important barrier to the development of harmonized processing of investment fund transactions in Europe.
