= Elliptic complex =

In mathematics, in particular in partial differential equations and differential geometry, an elliptic complex generalizes the notion of an elliptic operator to sequences. Elliptic complexes isolate those features common to the de Rham complex and the Dolbeault complex which are essential for performing Hodge theory. They also arise in connection with the Atiyah-Singer index theorem and Atiyah-Bott fixed point theorem.

== Definition ==
If E_{0}, E_{1}, ..., E_{k} are vector bundles on a smooth manifold M (usually taken to be compact), then a differential complex is a sequence

$$\Gamma(E_0) \stackrel{P_1}{\longrightarrow} \Gamma(E_1) \stackrel{P_2}{\longrightarrow} \ldots \stackrel{P_k}{\longrightarrow} \Gamma(E_k)$$

of differential operators between the sheaves of sections of the E_{i} such that P_{i+1} $\circ$ P_{i}=0. A differential complex with first order operators is elliptic if the sequence of symbols

$$0 \rightarrow \pi^*E_0 \stackrel{\sigma(P_1)}{\longrightarrow} \pi^*E_1 \stackrel{\sigma(P_2)}{\longrightarrow} \ldots \stackrel{\sigma(P_k)}{\longrightarrow} \pi^*E_k \rightarrow 0$$

is exact outside of the zero section. Here π is the projection of the cotangent bundle T*M to M, and π* is the pullback of a vector bundle.

== See also ==
- Chain complex
