= Nielsen theory =

Mathematical branch

Nielsen theory is a branch of mathematical research with its origins in topological fixed-point theory. Its central ideas were developed by Danish mathematician Jakob Nielsen, and bears his name.

The theory developed in the study of the so-called minimal number of a map f from a compact space to itself, denoted MF[f]. This is defined as:

$$\mathit{MF}[f] = \min \{ \# \mathrm{Fix}(g) \, | \, g \sim f \},$$

where ~ indicates homotopy of mappings, and #Fix(g) indicates the number of fixed points of g. The minimal number is very difficult to compute in Nielsen's time, and remains so today. Nielsen's approach is to group the fixed-point set into classes, which are judged "essential" or "nonessential" according to whether or not they can be "removed" by a homotopy.

Nielsen's original formulation is equivalent to the following: We define an equivalence relation on the set of fixed points of a self-map f on a space X. We say that x is equivalent to y if and only if there exists a path c from x to y with f(c) homotopic to c as paths. The equivalence classes with respect to this relation are called the Nielsen classes of f, and the Nielsen number N(f) is defined as the number of Nielsen classes having non-zero fixed-point index sum.

Nielsen proved that

$$N(f) \le \mathit{MF}[f],$$

making his invariant a good tool for estimating the much more difficult MF[f]. This leads immediately to what is now known as the Nielsen fixed-point theorem: Any map f has at least N(f) fixed points.

Because of its definition in terms of the fixed-point index, the Nielsen number is closely related to the Lefschetz number. Indeed, shortly after Nielsen's initial work, the two invariants were combined into a single "generalized Lefschetz number" (more recently called the Reidemeister trace) by Wecken and Reidemeister.

== Bibliography ==
- Fenchel, Werner; Nielsen, Jakob (2003). Asmus L. Schmidt (ed.). Discontinuous groups of isometries in the hyperbolic plane. De Gruyter Studies in mathematics. Vol. 29. Berlin: Walter de Gruyter & Co.
