= Earle–Hamilton fixed-point theorem =

In mathematics, the Earle–Hamilton fixed point theorem is a result in geometric function theory giving sufficient conditions for a holomorphic mapping of an open domain in a complex Banach space into itself to have a fixed point. The result was proved in 1968 by Clifford Earle and Richard S. Hamilton by showing that, with respect to the Carathéodory metric on the domain, the holomorphic mapping becomes a contraction mapping to which the Banach fixed-point theorem can be applied.

== Statement ==
Let D be a connected open subset of a complex Banach space X and let f be a holomorphic mapping of D into itself such that:

- the image f(D) is bounded in norm;
- the distance between points f(D) and points in the exterior of D is bounded below by a positive constant.

Then the mapping f has a unique fixed point x in D and if y is any point in D, the iterates f^{n}(y) converge to x.

== Proof ==
Replacing D by an ε-neighbourhood of f(D), it can be assumed that D is itself bounded in norm.

For z in D and v in X, set

$$\displaystyle{\alpha(z,v)=\sup_g |g^\prime(z)v|,}$$

where the supremum is taken over all holomorphic functions g on D with |g(z)| < 1.

Define the α-length of a piecewise differentiable curve γ:[0,1] $\rightarrow$ D by

$$\displaystyle{\ell(\gamma)=\int_0^1 \alpha(\gamma(t),\dot{\gamma}(t))\, dt.}$$

The Carathéodory metric is defined by

$$\displaystyle{d(x,y)=\inf_{\gamma(0)=x,\gamma(1)=y} \ell(\gamma)}$$

for x and y in D. It is a continuous function on D x D for the norm topology.

If the diameter of D is less than R then, by taking suitable holomorphic functions g of the form

$$\displaystyle{g(z)=a(z) + b}$$

with a in X* and b in C, it follows that

$$\displaystyle{\alpha(z,v)\ge \|v\|/R,}$$

and hence that

$$\displaystyle{d(x,y)\ge \|x-y\|/R.}$$

In particular d defines a metric on D.

The chain rule

$$\displaystyle{(g\circ f)^\prime(z)=g^\prime(f(z))f^\prime(z)}$$

implies that

$$\displaystyle{\alpha(f(z),f^\prime(z)v)\le \alpha(z,v)}$$

and hence f satisfies the following generalization of the Schwarz-Pick inequality:

$$\displaystyle{d(f(x),f(y))\le d(x,y).}$$

For δ sufficiently small and y fixed in D, the same inequality can be applied to the holomorphic mapping

$$\displaystyle{f_{\delta,y}(z)=f(z) +\delta (f(z)-f(y))}$$

and yields the improved estimate:

$$\displaystyle{d(f(x),f(y))\le (1+\delta)^{-1} d(x,y).}$$

The Banach fixed-point theorem can be applied to the restriction of f to the closure of f(D) on which d defines a complete metric, defining the same topology as the norm.

== Other holomorphic fixed point theorems ==
In finite dimensions the existence of a fixed point can often be deduced from the Brouwer fixed point theorem without any appeal to holomorphicity of the mapping. In the case of bounded symmetric domains with the Bergman metric, Neretin (1996) and Clerc (1998) showed that the same scheme of proof as that used in the Earle-Hamilton theorem applies. The bounded symmetric domain D = G / K is a complete metric space for the Bergman metric. The open semigroup of the complexification G_{c} taking the closure of D into D acts by contraction mappings, so again the Banach fixed-point theorem can be applied. Neretin extended this argument by continuity to some infinite-dimensional bounded symmetric domains, in particular the Siegel generalized disk of symmetric Hilbert-Schmidt operators with operator norm less than 1. The Earle-Hamilton theorem applies equally well in this case.
