= Fixed-point subgroup =

Algebraic expression

In algebra, the fixed-point subgroup $G^f$ of an automorphism f of a group G is the subgroup of G:

$$G^f = \{ g \in G \mid f(g) = g \}.$$

More generally, if S is a set of automorphisms of G (i.e., a subset of the automorphism group of G), then the set of the elements of G that are left fixed by every automorphism in S is a subgroup of G, denoted by G^{S}.

For example, take G to be the group of invertible n-by-n real matrices and $f(g)=(g^T)^{-1}$ (called the Cartan involution). Then $G^f$ is the group $O(n)$ of n-by-n orthogonal matrices.

To give an abstract example, let S be a subset of a group G. Then each element s of S can be associated with the automorphism $g \mapsto sgs^{-1}$, i.e. conjugation by s. Then

$$G^S = \{ g \in G \mid sgs^{-1} = g \text{ for all } s \in S\}$$;

that is, the centralizer of S.

== See also ==
- Ring of invariants
