= Fiber Patch Placement =

Fiber Patch Placement (FPP), initially known as Fiber-Patch-Preforming.., is a robot-operated manufacturing technology for fiber composite objects such carbon, glass and adhesives.

The basis of the Fiber Patch Placement process is the adaptation of the patch orientation to the locally or globally prevailing component complexity, e. g. the adaptation to a geometry, or to a complex load path.

== Description ==
In patch based production, predefined material strips (fiber patches) are cut from flat dry or pre-impregnated fiber tape by an automated cutting unit and applied robotically with positional accuracy to a three-dimensional forming tool with the help of a flexible patch gripper. The load path-oriented and almost scrap-free deposition of the individual increments directly on the final 3D geometry eliminates additional forming steps. The unwanted draping effects of the fibers during the lay-up can be avoided by using appropriate patch sizes, allied with the controlled and uniform deposition pressure from the form-flexible patch gripper.

As a Fiber Patch Placement laminate can consist of several thousands of patches, with this complexity, a purely manual programming of the production systems is no longer possible. The automated production process is therefore preceded by the virtual product development of the component, which is tailored to the FPP-specific laminate and placement functions.
