= Carathéodory metric =

In mathematics, the Carathéodory metric is a metric defined on the open unit ball of a complex Banach space that has many similar properties to the Poincaré metric of hyperbolic geometry. It is named after the Greek mathematician Constantin Carathéodory.

== Definition ==
Let (X, || ||) be a complex Banach space and let B be the open unit ball in X. Let Δ denote the open unit disc in the complex plane C, thought of as the Poincaré disc model for 2-dimensional real/1-dimensional complex hyperbolic geometry. Let the Poincaré metric ρ on Δ be given by

$$\rho (a, b) = \tanh^{-1} \frac{| a - b |}{|1 - \bar{a} b |}$$

(thus fixing the curvature to be −4). Then the Carathéodory metric d on B is defined by

$$d (x, y) = \sup \{ \rho (f(x), f(y)) | f : B \to \Delta \mbox{ is holomorphic} \}.$$

What it means for a function on a Banach space to be holomorphic is defined in the article on Infinite dimensional holomorphy.

== Properties ==
- For any point x in B,

$$d(0, x) = \rho(0, \| x \|).$$

- d can also be given by the following formula, which Carathéodory attributed to Erhard Schmidt:

$$d(x, y) = \sup \left\{ \left. 2 \tanh^{-1} \left\| \frac{f(x) - f(y)}{2} \right\| \right| f : B \to \Delta \mbox{ is holomorphic} \right\}$$

- For all a and b in B,

$$\| a - b \| \leq 2 \tanh \frac{d(a, b)}{2}, \qquad \qquad (1)$$

with equality if and only if either a = b or there exists a bounded linear functional ℓ ∈ X^{∗} such that ||ℓ|| = 1, ℓ(a + b) = 0 and

$$\rho (\ell (a), \ell (b)) = d(a, b).$$

Moreover, any ℓ satisfying these three conditions has |ℓ(a − b)| = ||a − b||.

- Also, there is equality in (1) if ||a|| = ||b|| and ||a − b|| = ||a|| + ||b||. One way to do this is to take b = −a.
- If there exists a unit vector u in X that is not an extreme point of the closed unit ball in X, then there exist points a and b in B such that there is equality in (1) but b ≠ ±a.

== Carathéodory length of a tangent vector ==
There is an associated notion of Carathéodory length for tangent vectors to the ball B. Let x be a point of B and let v be a tangent vector to B at x; since B is the open unit ball in the vector space X, the tangent space T_{x}B can be identified with X in a natural way, and v can be thought of as an element of X. Then the Carathéodory length of v at x, denoted α(x, v), is defined by

$$\alpha (x, v) = \sup \big\{ | \mathrm{D} f(x) v | \big| f : B \to \Delta \mbox{ is holomorphic} \big\}.$$

One can show that α(x, v) ≥ ||v||, with equality when x = 0.

== See also ==
- Earle–Hamilton fixed point theorem
