= Dottie number =

Mathematical constant related to the cosine function

The Dottie number is the unique real fixed point of the cosine function.

In mathematics, the Dottie number or the cosine constant is a constant that is the unique real root of the equation
$$\cos x = x ,$$
where the argument of $\cos$ is in radians.

The decimal expansion of the Dottie number is given by:
D = 0.739085133215160641655312087673... (sequence A003957 in the OEIS).

Since $\cos(x) - x$ is decreasing and its derivative is non-zero at $\cos(x) - x = 0$, it only crosses zero at one point. This implies that the equation $\cos(x) = x$ has only one real solution. It is the single real-valued fixed point of the cosine function and is a nontrivial example of a universal attracting fixed point. It is also a transcendental number because of the Lindemann–Weierstrass theorem. The generalised case $\cos z = z$ for a complex variable $z$ has infinitely many roots, but unlike the Dottie number, they are not attracting fixed points.

The solution of quadrisection of circle into four parts of the same area with chords coming from the same point can be expressed via Dottie number.

== History ==
The constant appeared in publications as early as 1860s. Norair Arakelian used lowercase ayb (ա) from the Armenian alphabet to denote the constant.

The constant name was coined by Samuel R. Kaplan in 2007. It originates from a professor of French named Dottie who observed the number by repeatedly pressing the cosine button on her calculator. (Note: If a calculator is set to take angles in degrees, the sequence of numbers will instead converge to $0.999847...$, the root of $\cos\left(\frac{\pi}{180}x\right) = x$.)

The Dottie number, for which an exact series expansion can be obtained using the Faà di Bruno formula, has interesting connections with the Kepler and Bertrand's circle problems.

== Identities ==
The Dottie number appears in the closed form expression of some integrals:
$$\int _0^\infty\ln \left(\frac{4\left(x+\sinh x\right)^2+\pi^2}{4(x-\sinh x)^2+\pi ^2}\right){\rm d}x = \pi^2 - 2\pi D$$
$$\int_{0 }^\infty \frac{3\pi^2+4(x-\sinh x)^2}{(3\pi^2+4(x-\sinh x)^2)^2 + 16\pi^2(x-\sinh x)^2}\,{\rm d}x = \frac1{8+8\sqrt{1-D^2}}$$

Using the Taylor series of the inverse of $f(x) = \cos(x) - x$ at $\frac{\pi}{2}$ (or equivalently, the Lagrange inversion theorem), the Dottie number can be expressed as the infinite series:
$$D = \frac{\pi}{2}+\sum_{n\,\mathrm{odd}} a_n \pi^{n}$$
where each $a_n$ is a rational number defined for odd n as (Note: Kaplan does not give an explicit formula for the terms of the series, which follows trivially from the Lagrange inversion theorem.)
$$\begin{align}
a_n&=\frac{1}{n!2^n}\lim_{m\to\frac\pi2}
\frac{\partial^{n-1}}{\partial m^{n-1}}{\left(\frac{\cos m}{m-\pi/2}-1\right)^{-n}}
\\&=-\frac{1}{4},-\frac{1}{768},-\frac{1}{61440},-\frac{43}{165150720},\ldots
\end{align}$$

The Dottie number can also be expressed as:
$$D=\sqrt{1-\left(1-2I^{-1}_\frac12\left(\frac 12,\frac 32\right)\right)^2},$$
where $I^{-1}$ is the inverse of the regularized beta function. This value can be obtained using Kepler's equation, along with other equivalent closed forms. $I^{-1}_\frac12\left(\tfrac 12,\tfrac 32\right) \approx 0.16319$ is the median of a beta distribution with parameters 1/2 and 3/2.

In Microsoft Excel, Open Office and LibreOffice Calc spreadsheets, the Dottie number can be expressed in closed form as SQRT(1-(1-2*BETA.INV(1/2,1/2,3/2))^2). In the Mathematica computer algebra system, the Dottie number is Sqrt[1 - (1-2 InverseBetaRegularized[1/2, 1/2, 3/2])^2].

Another closed form representation:
$$D=- \tanh\left(2\operatorname{arctanh}\left(\frac1{\sqrt3} \operatorname{InvT} \left(\frac14,3\right)\right)\right)=-\frac{2\sqrt3 {\operatorname{InvT}\left(\frac14,3\right)}}{\operatorname{InvT}^2\left(\frac14,3\right)+3},$$
where $\operatorname{InvT}$ is the inverse survival function of Student's t-distribution. In Microsoft Excel, Open Office and LibreOffice Calc, due to the specifics of the realization of TINV function, this can be expressed as formulas 2 *SQRT(3)* TINV(1/2, 3)/(TINV(1/2, 3)^2+3) and TANH(2*ATANH(1/SQRT(3) * TINV(1/2,3))).
