= European Fund and Asset Management Association =

- Abbreviation: EFAMA
- Established: 1974; 52 years ago
- Purpose: Representing the fund management and asset management industry in Europe
- Location: Brussels, Belgium
- President: Samantha Ricciardi, CEO, Fidelity International EMEA
- Vice President: Micaela Forelli, CEO, M&G Asset Management
- Director General: Tanguy van de Werve
- Website: www.efama.org

The European Fund and Asset Management Association (EFAMA) is the representative body of the European investment management industry, headquartered in Brussels, Belgium. Its members collectively manage around EUR 33 trillion in assets on behalf of clients in Europe and worldwide. As of 2026, the association included 29 national associations, 47 asset management firms and 30 associate members.

== Mission and activities ==
As a trade association, EFAMA promotes the interests of its members to ensure that regulatory policy supports the crucial role of asset management in steering capital towards productive investments and providing long-term value to investors. Its diverse membership and expertise make it a key interlocutor for European Union institutions on policy and regulatory matters affecting the sector.

EFAMA engages with EU policymakers, supervisors and international authorities to advance the Savings & Investment Union (SIU), empower consumers to become investors, promote sustainable finance, and ensure open and well-functioning global capital markets. Since its establishment, it has supported European integration and contributed to the broader goals of the EU Single Market.

The association is also a recognised source of industry research and statistics. Its flagship publications, including the EFAMA Fact Book, the Asset Management Report, and Market Insights, provide detailed analysis of market trends, regulatory developments, and industry data. EFAMA also organises the annual Investment Management Forum, a major European event for senior industry executives and policymakers, along with other conferences and webinars throughout the year.

EFAMA is a member of the International Investment Funds Association, EFRAG, the OECD International Network on Financial Education (INFE), and the EPFSF. They are represented on ESMA’s Securities and Markets Stakeholder Group (SMSG), EIOPA’s Occupation Pensions Stakeholder Group (OPSG), EFAMA is a co-founder of European Retirement Week and long-time supporter of IOSCO’s World Investor Week.

== History ==
EFAMA was founded in 1974 as the European Federation of Investment Funds and Companies (FEFSI). The founding members included national associations from Belgium, France, Germany, Denmark, Ireland, Italy, the Netherlands, and the United Kingdom.

In 2004, the organisation amended its statutes to represent both the investment fund and asset management industries and expanded its membership to include corporate and associate members. Following this change, it adopted its current name, the European Fund and Asset Management Association (EFAMA).

== The Role of Asset Management ==
Asset management plays a central role in Europe’s financial system by directing the savings of individuals and institutions into productive investment. This activity supports economic growth, job creation, and the transition to a sustainable economy, while helping investors meet long-term objectives such as retirement and education.

By investing in bonds, equities, and other securities, asset managers provide financing for companies and governments, while promoting market stability through diversification and risk management. The sector also advances environmental, social, and governance (ESG) standards by investing in responsible projects and engaging with companies to improve their sustainability practices.

In Europe, asset management is a major source of employment, with around 120,000 people directly employed and approximately 670,000 jobs linked to related services across the value chain.

== Sources ==
European Transparency Register Number: 3373670692-24
