= Fixed-point property =

Mathematical property

A mathematical object $X$ has the fixed-point property if every suitably well-behaved mapping from $X$ to itself has a fixed point. The term is most commonly used to describe topological spaces on which every continuous mapping has a fixed point. But another use is in order theory, where a partially ordered set $P$ is said to have the fixed point property if every increasing function on $P$ has a fixed point.

== Definition ==
Let $A$ be an object in the concrete category $\mathbf{C}$. Then $A$ has the fixed-point property if every morphism (i.e., every function) $f: A \to A$ has a fixed point.

The most common usage is when $\mathbf{C} = \mathbf{Top}$ is the category of topological spaces. Then a topological space $X$ has the fixed-point property if every continuous map $f: X \to X$ has a fixed point.

== Examples ==
=== Singletons ===
In the category of sets, the objects with the fixed-point property are precisely the singletons.

=== The closed interval ===
The closed interval $[0, 1]$ has the fixed point property: Let $f : [0, 1] \to [0, 1]$ be a continuous mapping. If $f(0) = 0$ or $f(1) = 1$, then our mapping has a fixed point at 0 or 1. If not, then $f(0) > 0$ and $f(1) - 1 < 0$. Thus the function $f(g) = f(x) - x$ is a continuous real valued function which is positive at $x = 0$ and negative at $x = 1$. By the intermediate value theorem, there is some point $x_0$ with $g(x_0) = 0$, which is to say that $f(x) - x = 0$, and so $x_0$ is a fixed point.

The open interval does not have the fixed-point property. The mapping $f(x) = x^2$ has no fixed point on the interval $(0, 1)$.

=== The closed disc ===
The closed interval is a special case of the closed disc, which in any finite dimension has the fixed-point property by the Brouwer fixed-point theorem.

== Topology ==
A retract $A$ of a space $X$ with the fixed-point property also has the fixed-point property. This is because if $r: X \to A$ is a retraction and $f: A \to A$ is any continuous function, then the composition $i \circ f \circ r: X \to X$ (where $i: A \to X$ is inclusion) has a fixed point. That is, there is $x \in A$ such that $f \circ r(x) = x$. Since $x \in A$ we have that $r(x) = x$ and therefore $f(x) = x.$

A topological space has the fixed-point property if and only if its identity map is universal.

A product of spaces with the fixed-point property in general fails to have the fixed-point property even if one of the spaces is the closed real interval.

The FPP is a topological invariant, i.e. is preserved by any homeomorphism. The FPP is also preserved by any retraction.

According to the Brouwer fixed-point theorem, every compact and convex subset of a Euclidean space has the FPP. More generally, according to the Schauder-Tychonoff fixed point theorem every compact and convex subset of a locally convex topological vector space has the FPP. Compactness alone does not imply the FPP and convexity is not even a topological property so it makes sense to ask how to topologically characterize the FPP. In 1932 Borsuk asked whether compactness together with contractibility could be a sufficient condition for the FPP to hold. The problem was open for 20 years until the conjecture was disproved by Kinoshita who found an example of a compact contractible space without the FPP.
