= Lefschetz fixed-point theorem =

Mapping theorem in topology

In mathematics, the Lefschetz fixed-point theorem is a formula that counts the fixed points of a continuous mapping from a compact triangulable topological space $X$ to itself by means of traces of the induced mappings on the homology groups of $X$. It is named after Solomon Lefschetz, who first stated it in 1926 but in a different way involving the coincidence points of functions.

There are different versions of this theorem: the weak version shows only the existence of a fixed point when a expression dependent on traces for a mapping is nonzero. The stronger version of the theorem, sometimes called the Lefschetz-Hopf theorem, counts fixed points with respect to their fixed-point index, provided that their number is finite. There is also a algebraic geometry counterpart of this theorem called the Lefschetz trace formula that expresses the number of points of a variety over a finite field in terms of the action of the Frobenius morphism on its cohomologies.

The topological versions of Lefschetz fixed-point theorem are generalizations of other classical results in topology like Brouwer fixed-point theorem or Poincare-Hopf theorem.

== Historical context ==
Lefschetz presented his fixed-point theorem in his 1926 paper about mappings on manifolds. Lefschetz's focus was not on fixed points of maps, but rather on what are now called coincidence points of maps.

Lefschetz defined coincidence number for two functions as an alternating sum of traces of maps induced on homologies and cohomologies by two functions and isomorphisms arising from Poincare duality for both manifolds. He proved that if this number is nonzero, then $f$ and $g$ must have a coincidence point.

Lefschetz also noted in his paper that assuming $X=Y$ and $g=Id_X$ gives a simpler result, which is now known as the fixed-point theorem.

== Formal statement ==
Let $f\colon X \rightarrow X\,$ be a continuous map from a compact triangulable space $X$ to itself. Each such map induces maps on singular homologies of $X$:

$$f_*:H_n(X,\mathbb{Q}) \rightarrow H_n(X,\mathbb{Q})$$

In general case homologies are R-modules, but since in this case R is a field, homologies are vector spaces and maps induced on them are linear maps. This allows to define properly a traces of such mappings.

Now define the Lefschetz number of map $f$ as the alternating sum of traces of maps induced on homologies by $f$:

$$\Lambda_f:=\sum_{n = 0}^{\infty}(-1)^{n}\mathrm{tr}(f_*:H_n(X,\mathbb{Q}) \rightarrow H_n(X,\mathbb{Q})),$$

since for compact and triangulable space from some point the homologies are trivial and traces are zeros, this sum is finite and well-defined.

=== Weak version of theorem ===
A simplest version of the Lefschetz fixed-point theorem states that if $\Lambda_f \neq 0\,$, then $f$ has a fixed point. In other words, there exists $x\in X$ such that $f(x)=x$.

=== Lefschetz–Hopf theorem ===
Assume additionally that $f$ has only finitely many fixed points, denote set of this points as $\mathrm{Fix}(f)$. Let $\mathrm{ind}(f,x)$ denote the fixed-point index for $x\in X$ and map $f:X \rightarrow X$. Then holds:

$$\sum_{x \in \mathrm{Fix}(f)} \mathrm{ind}(f,x) = \Lambda_f,$$

=== Original coincidence theorem ===
Assume that $X$ and $Y$ be compact and orientable manifolds of the same dimension. Let $f,g:X \rightarrow Y$ be continuous maps. We take maps induced on homologies by $f$ on homologies in a covariant way:

$$f_*:H_n(X,\mathbb{Q}) \rightarrow H_n(Y,\mathbb{Q})$$

and take a maps induced on cohomologies by $g$ in a contravariant way:

$$g^*:H^n(Y,\mathbb{Q}) \rightarrow H^n(X,\mathbb{Q})$$

For passing between homologies and cohomologies we are using isomorphisms of Poincare duality for respectively $X$ and $Y$:

$$D_X:H^n(X,\mathbb{Q}) \rightarrow H_n(X,\mathbb{Q})$$
$$D_Y:H^n(Y,\mathbb{Q}) \rightarrow H_n(Y,\mathbb{Q})$$

The composition $D_X \circ g^* \circ D_Y^{-1} \circ f_*$ is a linear mapping from $H_n(X,\mathbb{Q})$ to itself. Then Lefschetz coincidence number is defined as:

$$\Lambda_{f,g} = \sum_{n=0}^{\infty} (-1)^k \mathrm{tr}( D_X \circ g^* \circ D_Y^{-1} \circ f_*).$$

In his original paper Lefschetz proved that if $\Lambda_{f,g} \neq 0$, then $f$ and $g$ must have a coincidence point. In other words, there exists $x\in X$ such that: $f(x) = g(x)$

== Remarks ==
The converse of Lefschetz theorem is not true in general: $\Lambda_f$ may be zero even if $f$ has fixed points, as is the case for the identity map on odd-dimensional spheres.

Since homotopic maps induce the same maps on homologies, then Lefschetz numbers are equal for two homotopic maps.

The Lefschetz number of the identity map on a finite CW complex can be easily computed by realizing that each $f_\ast$ can be thought of as an identity matrix, and so each trace term is simply the dimension of the appropriate homology group. Thus the Lefschetz number of the identity map is equal to the alternating sum of the Betti numbers of the space, which in turn is equal to the Euler characteristic $\chi(X)$. Thus we have

$$\Lambda_{\mathrm{id}} = \chi(X).\$$

Consequently, each map homotopic to identity map have Lefschetz number equal to Euler characteristic of $X$

The same conclusion could be obtained for any compact Absolute neighborhood retract, in particular any compact topological manifold. The basic ingredient behind this extension is that compact Absolute neighborhood retracts are homotopy equivalent to finite simplicial complexes.

== Sketch of a proof ==
First, by applying the simplicial approximation theorem, one shows that if $f$ has no fixed points, then (possibly after subdividing $X$) $f$ is homotopic to a fixed-point-free simplicial map (i.e., it sends each simplex to a different simplex). This means that the diagonal values of the matrices of the linear maps induced on the simplicial chain complex of $X$ must all be zero. Then one notes that, in general, the Lefschetz number can also be computed using the alternating sum of the matrix traces of the aforementioned linear maps. In the particular case of a fixed-point-free simplicial map, all of the diagonal values are zero, and thus the traces are all zero.

== Consequences ==
The different versions of Lefschetz theorem are generalization of classical results in topology.

=== Brouwer fixed-point theorem ===
The Brouwer fixed-point theorem says that if $D^n$ is n-dimensional closed unit disc, then every continuous map $f:D^n\rightarrow D^n$ must have fixed point.

Since $D^n$ is compact and triangulable space, the condition of Lefschetz theorem applies. The homology groups with rational coefficient for $D^n$ are:

$$H_n(D^n,\mathbb{Q}) = \begin{cases} \mathbb{Q} & \text{if} & n = 0 & \\ 0 & \text{if} & n > 0 \end{cases}$$

Because $D^n$ is convex space, then every map $f:D^n\rightarrow D^n$ is homotopic to each other, particularly identity map. Then:

$$\Lambda_{f} = \chi(D^n) = 1$$

From weak version of Lefschetz theorem $f$ must have a fixed point.

=== Poincare-Hopf theorem ===
Poincare-Hopf theorem is a consequence of Lefschetz-Hopf theorem. It says that for a vector $v$ field on a compact differentiable manifold $M$ with isolated zeros holds:

$$\sum_{v(x)=0} \operatorname{index}_{x}(v) = \chi(M)$$

In case of differential manifold with boundary, the vector field is assuned to go along boundary.

Because differential manifold is always triangulable, assumption about space is satisfied. Despite this theorem concerns zeros of vector fields instead of fixed points and indices are defined in a different way, the connection comes from the fact that any vector field on a compact differential manifold treated as a velocity induces a flow:

$$\varphi(x,t): M \times [0,\infty) \rightarrow M$$

in a natural way, where in every local chart on $M$ it is given as a solution of differential equation:

$$\frac{\partial \varphi(x,t)}{\partial t} = v(x) \qquad \varphi(x,0) = x$$

For every $t \geq 0$ map $\varphi_t(x):=\varphi(x,t)$ is homotopic to $\varphi_0(x)=Id_M$, hence:

$$\Lambda_{\varphi_t} = \chi(M)$$

Clearly zeros of vector field remains fixed points of any $\varphi_t$. Choosing sufficiently small $\varepsilon_0 > 0$ it can be assured that for $\varepsilon > t > 0$ they will be only fixed points of $\varphi_t$. The indices of vector field zeros are defined as a degree of map $u:\partial D \rightarrow \mathbb{S}^{n-1}$, where $D$ is local neighbourhood of $x$ that not contain any other zero of $x$ and is homeomorphic to n-dimensional ball and the map $u$ is given as:

$$u(x)=\frac{v(x)}{\vert v(x)\vert}$$

For each zero $x_i$ of vector field there exists $\varepsilon_i > 0$ such that for $\varepsilon_i > t > 0$:

$$\operatorname{index}_{x_i}(v) = \mathrm{ind}(\varphi_t,x)$$

Choosing $\varepsilon = \min\lbrace \varepsilon_0, \dots , \varepsilon_n \rbrace$ we get that for every $\varepsilon > t > 0$ Lefschetz-Hopf theorem equality applied to $\varphi_t$ gives desired result.

== Lefschetz trace formula ==
Let $X$ be a variety defined over the finite field $k$ with $q$ elements and let $\bar X$ be the base change of $X$ to the algebraic closure of $k$. The Frobenius endomorphism of $\bar X$ (often the geometric Frobenius, or just the Frobenius), denoted by $F_q$, maps a point with coordinates $x_1,\ldots,x_n$ to the point with coordinates $x_1^q,\ldots,x_n^q$. Thus the fixed points of $F_q$ are exactly the points of $X$ with coordinates in $k$; the set of such points is denoted by $X(k)$. The Lefschetz trace formula holds in this context, and reads:

$$\#X(k)=\sum_i (-1)^i \mathrm{tr}(F_q^*| H^i_c(\bar{X},\Q_{\ell})).$$

This formula involves the trace of the Frobenius on the étale cohomology, with compact supports, of $\bar X$ with values in the field of $\ell$-adic numbers, where $\ell$ is a prime coprime to $q$.

If $X$ is smooth and equidimensional, this formula can be rewritten in terms of the arithmetic Frobenius $\Phi_q$, which acts as the inverse of $F_q$ on cohomology:

$$\#X(k)=q^{\dim X}\sum_i (-1)^i \mathrm{tr}((\Phi_q^{-1})^*| H^i(\bar X,\Q_\ell)).$$

This formula involves usual cohomology, rather than cohomology with compact supports.

The Lefschetz trace formula can also be generalized to algebraic stacks over finite fields.

== See also ==
- Fixed-point theorems
- Lefschetz zeta function
- Holomorphic Lefschetz fixed-point formula
