= Photographic quantity =

Measure of the amount of light received by a sensor

Photographic quantity (also known as photoquantity) is a measure of the amount of light received by a sensor, such as a camera, in dimensionless units that account for information lost by integration over the spectral response of the sensor, while otherwise preserving the linear relationship involved in the interaction of light through one or more exposures. The photoquantity is neither radiometric nor photometric. The photoquantity is not radiometric because the sensor, camera, or the like, is not an ideal receiving antenna. Rather, the sensor has some non-flat spectral response. The photoquantity is not photometric, because the sensor's spectral response does not necessarily match the spectral response of the human eye.

Photoquantities are often involved in the solutions to comparametric equations, appear in research papers dealing with image processing, and are also used in the production of visual art made from multiple differently illuminated pictures of the same subject matter.
