= Blackwell's contraction mapping theorem =

Mathematical theorem regarding operators

In mathematics, Blackwell's contraction mapping theorem provides a set of sufficient conditions for an operator to be a contraction mapping. It is widely used in areas that rely on dynamic programming as it facilitates the proof of existence of fixed points. The result is due to David Blackwell who published it in 1965 in the Annals of Mathematical Statistics.

== Statement of the Theorem ==
Let $T$ be an operator defined over an ordered normed vector space $X$. $T: X \rightarrow X$ is a contraction mapping with modulus $\beta$ if it satisfies

1. $(monotonicity) \quad u \leq v \implies Tu \leq Tv$
2. $(discounting) \quad T(u+c) \leq Tu+\beta c.$

== Proof of the Theorem ==
For all $u$ and $v \in X$, $u \leq v + ||v-u||$. Properties 1. and 2. imply that $T(v) \leq T(u + ||v-u||) \leq T(u) + \beta ||v-u||$, hence, $T(v)-T(u) \leq \beta ||v-u||$. Therefore $||T(v)-T(u)|| \leq \beta ||v-u||$ and $T$ is a contraction mapping.

== Illustration ==
If $X$ is the real line with the usual order structure and $T: X \rightarrow X$ is a differentiable map satisfying $0 \leq T'(x) \leq \beta <1$, then $T$ satisfies the assumption because $T'(x) >0$ is equivalent to monotonicity and because the derivative assumption implies with the fundamental theorem of calculus that the discounting assumption $T(u+c) =T(u) + \int_0^c T'(t) \; dt \leq \int_0^c \beta \; dt = Tu+\beta c$ holds. The conclusion of the Blackwell's contraction mapping theorem is that $T$ is a contraction. While this is not an impressive conclusion in the context of calculus, it is notable that the theorem does not make any differentiability assumption. The discounting assumption however implies that T is Lipschitz continuous.

== Applications ==
=== The cake eating problem ===
An agent has access to only one cake for its entire, infinite, life. It has to decide the optimal way to consume it. It evaluates a consumption plan, $c_t$, by using a separable utility function, $\sum_{t=0}^{\infty} \beta^t \frac{c_t^{1-\sigma}}{1-\sigma}$, with discounting factor $\beta \in (0,1)$. Its problem can be summarized as

$\max_{c_t}\sum_{t=0}^{\infty} \beta^t \frac{c_t^{1-\sigma}}{1-\sigma} \text{ subject to } x_t = x_{t-1} - c_t \text{, } x_{-1}=1 \text{, }c_t\geq0 \text{ and } x_t \geq 0 \, \forall \, t \, \in \, \mathbb{Z}_+$. (1)

Applying Bellman's principle of optimality we find (1)'s corresponding Bellman equation

$V(c) = \max_{c' \in [0, c]} \frac{{c'}^{1-\sigma}}{1-\sigma} + \beta V(c - c')$. (2)

It can be proven that the solution to this functional equation, if it exists, is equivalent to the solution of (1). To prove its existence we can resort to Blackwell's sufficient conditions.

Define the operator $T(V(c)) = \sup_{c'} \frac{c^{1-\sigma}}{1-\sigma} + \beta V(c - c')$. A solution to (2) is equivalent to finding a fixed-point for our operator. If we prove that this operator is a contraction mapping then we can use Banach's fixed-point theorem, and conclude that there is indeed a solution to (1).

Note that $T$ is defined over the space $X$ of bounded functions on $[0,1]$, and maps bounded functions to bounded functions. Notice that the desired value function for our problem is clearly bounded. Endowing $X$ with the sup-norm we conclude that the domain and co-domain are ordered normed vector spaces. We are just left with verifying that the conditions for Blackwell's theorem are respected:

1. (monotonicity) $\text{if }V(c) \geq U(c) \, \forall \, c \, \in \, [0,1]$ then $T(V(c)) = \max_{c'} \frac{{c'}^{1-\sigma}}{1-\sigma} + \beta V(c - c') \geq \max_{c'} \frac{{c'}^{1-\sigma}}{1-\sigma} + \beta U(c - c') = T(U(c))$
2. (discounting) $T(V(c)+a) = \max_{c'} \frac{{c'}^{1-\sigma}}{1-\sigma} + \beta (V(c - c') + a) \leq \max_{c'} \frac{{c'}^{1-\sigma}}{1-\sigma} + \beta V(c - c') + \beta a = T(V(c)) + \beta a$ where $a$ is a constant function.
