= B. R. Bhat =

Indian statistician

Beliyar Ramdas Bhat
- Education: University of California, Berkeley
- Scientific career
- Workplaces: Karnatak University
- Thesis: Bayes Sequential Tests in Markov Chains (1961)
- Doctoral advisor: David Blackwell

Beliyar Ramdas Bhat was a professor and head of the department of statistics at Karnatak University in India for more than two decades. After retiring from Karnatak University, he became a professor at the University of Botswana in Africa. He was elected member of International Statistical Institute and the Institute of Mathematical Statistics and Fellow of Royal Statistical Society.

Bhat obtained a M.A. degree in mathematics from Madras University in 1954, and a M.A. degree in statistics from Karnataka University, prior to working on a Ph.D. from Berkeley in 1961. His advisor was David Blackwell. Bhat was elected member of Institute of Mathematical Statistics, and South African Statistical Association. He was the Secretary, Editor and President of Indian Society for Probability and Statistics. He was also the past President of the Section of Statistics of the Indian Science Congress Association.

== Selected works ==
Bhat was the author of books including:

- Modern Probability Theory: An Introductory Textbook. New Delhi, India: Wiley Eastern. 1986. ISBN 0-85226-091-1.
- Stochastic Processes and Statistical Inference. New Age International. 1996. ISBN 81-224-0836-2.
- Stochastic Models: Analysis and Applications. New Age International. 2000. ISBN 9788122412284.

He was the founding editor-in-chief of the Journal of the Indian Society for Probability and Statistics.
