= CLRg property =

In mathematics, the notion of "common limit in the range" property denoted by CLRg property is a theorem that unifies, generalizes, and extends the contractive mappings in fuzzy metric spaces, where the range of the mappings does not necessarily need to be a closed subspace of a non-empty set $X$.

Suppose $X$ is a non-empty set, and $d$ is a distance metric; thus, $(X, d)$ is a metric space. Now suppose we have self mappings $f,g : X \to X.$ These mappings are said to fulfil CLRg property if

$$\lim_{k \to \infty} f x_{k} = \lim_{k \to \infty} g x_{k} = gx,$$
for some $x \in X.$

Next, we give some examples that satisfy the CLRg property.

== Examples ==
=== Example 1 ===
Suppose $(X,d)$ is a usual metric space, with $X=[0,\infty).$ Now, if the mappings $f,g: X \to X$ are defined respectively as follows:

- $fx = \frac{x}{4}$
- $gx = \frac{3x}{4}$

for all $x\in X.$ Now, if the following sequence $\{x_k\}=\{1/k\}$ is considered. We can see that

$$\lim_{k\to \infty}fx_{k} = \lim_{k\to \infty}gx_{k} = g0 = 0,$$

thus, the mappings $f$ and $g$ fulfilled the CLRg property.

Another example that shades more light to this CLRg property is given below

=== Example 2 ===
Let $(X,d)$ is a usual metric space, with $X=[0,\infty).$ Now, if the mappings $f,g: X \to X$ are defined respectively as follows:

- $fx = x+1$
- $gx = 2x$

for all $x\in X.$ Now, if the following sequence $\{x_k\}=\{1+1/k \}$ is considered. We can easily see that

$$\lim_{k\to \infty}fx_{k} = \lim_{k\to \infty}gx_{k} = g1 = 2,$$

hence, the mappings $f$ and $g$ fulfilled the CLRg property.
