= George Roussas =

Greek-American statistician (born 1933)

- Born: June 29, 1933 (age 92); Marmara, Phthiotis, Greece
- Education: University of Athens; University of California, Berkeley
- Scientific career
- Institutions: San Jose State University; University of Wisconsin–Madison; University of Patras; University of Crete; University of California, Davis
- Thesis: Some Extensions of Dubins and Savages Work on Red and Black (1964)
- Doctoral advisor: David Blackwell; Lucien Le Cam
- Website: statistics.ucdavis.edu/people/george-roussas

George Gregory Roussas (born June 29, 1933) is a Greek-American professor emeritus in statistics at University of California, Davis. He is noted for his contributions in asymptotic statistics and stochastic processes.

== Education and career ==
Roussas was born in the central Greece region of Phthiotis. He studied mathematics at University of Athens in Greece and received his BSc in 1956. Afterwards, he moved to the US, studying for a PhD in statistics at University of California, Berkeley under the supervision of David Blackwell and Lucien Le Cam. He received his PhD from Berkeley in 1964.

Roussas started his academic career in the statistics faculty at San Jose State University in 1964 as an assistant professor. He then moved to University of Wisconsin–Madison in 1966, where he progressed from an assistant professor to a full professor in 1972. During this time, he also took up administrative position at University of Patras and University of Crete in his home country, Greece. Roussas moved to University of California, Davis in 1985 and took up the chair in the Department of Statistics. He became distinguished Professor at University of California, Davis in 2003 and retired there in 2012.

== Honors and awards ==
Roussas became a Fellow of the Royal Statistical Society in 1975, a Fellow of the Institute of Mathematical Statistics in 1983, a Fellow of the American Statistical Association in 1986, and a Fellow of the American Association for the Advancement of Science in 2010.

== Bibliography ==
- Roussas, George G. (2014). An introduction to probability and statistical inference (2nd ed.). Amsterdam: Academic Press. ISBN 978-0-12-800437-1. OCLC 893164163.
- Roussas, George G. (2014). An introduction to measure-theoretic probability (2nd ed.). Amsterdam: Academic Press. ISBN 978-0-12-800290-2. OCLC 876589188.
- Roussas, George G. (2007). Introduction to probability. Amsterdam. ISBN 978-0-12-800041-0. OCLC 865574698.
- Roussas, George G. (1997). A course in mathematical statistics (2nd ed.). San Diego, Calif.: Academic Press. ISBN 978-1-4294-8350-6. OCLC 166329204.
- Roussas, George G. (1972). Contiguity of probability measures: some applications in statistics. Cambridge, UK: Cambridge University Press. ISBN 0-521-08354-0. OCLC 482355.
