= David Matula =

American computer scientist

- Education: Washington University in St. Louis (BS); University of California, Berkeley (PhD)
- Scientific career
- Workplaces: Washington University in St. Louis; Southern Methodist University
- Thesis: Games of Sequence Prediction (1966)
- Doctoral advisor: David Blackwell

David William Matula (born 1937) is an American mathematician and computer scientist known for his research on graph theory, graph algorithms, computer arithmetic, and algorithm engineering. He is a professor emeritus at Southern Methodist University, where he formerly held the Cruse C. and Marjorie F. Calahan Centennial Chair in Engineering.

== Education and career ==
Matula was an undergraduate in Engineering physics at Washington University in St. Louis, graduating in 1959. He completed his Ph.D. in 1966 at the University of California, Berkeley, with the dissertation Games of Sequence Prediction supervised by David Blackwell.

After completing his Ph.D., he returned to Washington University in St. Louis as a faculty member. He joined the Southern Methodist University faculty in 1974 as chair of the Computer Science and Engineering Department, was named to the Cruse C. and Marjorie F. Calahan Centennial Chair in Engineering in 2016, and retired in 2018.

== Book ==
Matula is the coauthor, with Peter Kornerup, of the book Finite Precision Number Systems and Arithmetic (Encyclopedia of Mathematics and its Applications 133, Cambridge University Press, 2010).
