= David Blackwell =

American mathematician and statistician (1919–2010)

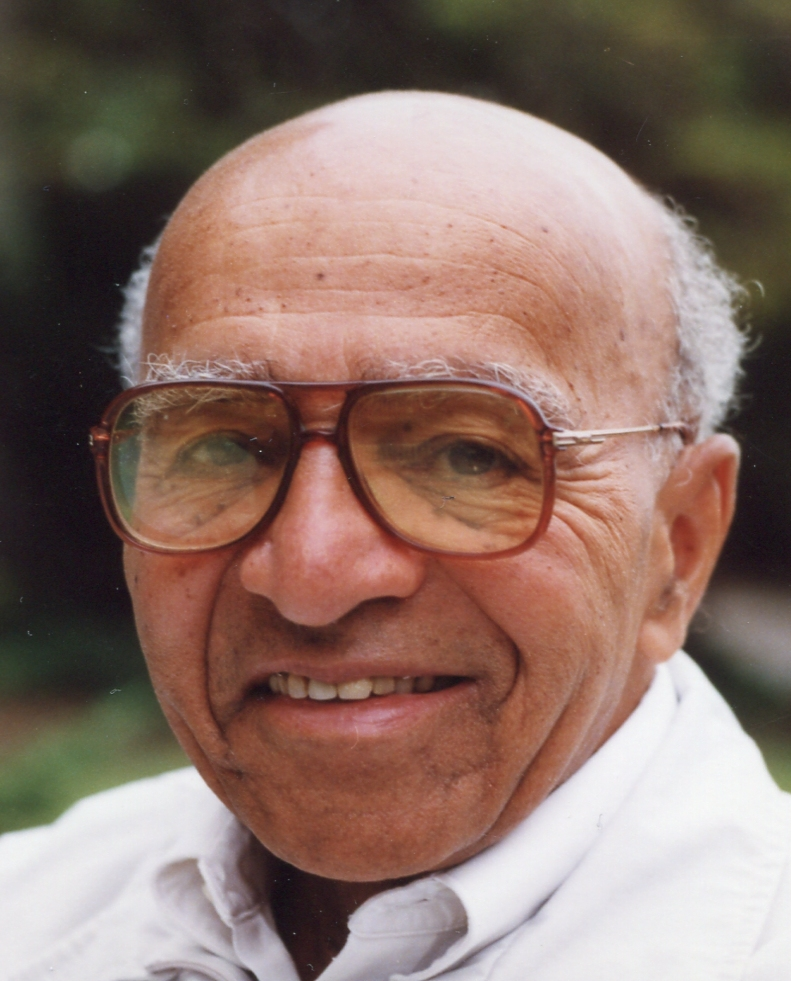
- Blackwell in 1999
- Born: David Harold Blackwell; April 24, 1919; Centralia, Illinois, U.S.
- Died: July 8, 2010 (aged 91); Berkeley, California, U.S.
- Education: University of Illinois at Urbana-Champaign (BA, MA, PhD)
- Known for: Rao–Blackwell theorem Blackwell channel Blackwell's contraction mapping theorem Blackwell order
- Spouse: Annlizabeth Madison Blackwell
- Children: 8
- Awards: John von Neumann Theory Prize (1979); R. A. Fisher Lectureship (1986); National Medal of Science (2012)
- Scientific career
- Fields: Probability; Statistics; Logic; Game theory Dynamic programming
- Workplaces: Howard University; University of California, Berkeley
- Thesis: Some properties of Markoff chains (1941)
- Doctoral advisor: Joseph Leo Doob
- Doctoral students: B. R. Bhat; Rolando Chuaqui; Carlos Alberto Barbosa Dantas; David Matula; George Roussas; Roger J-B Wets; Richard S. Bucy

David Harold Blackwell (April 24, 1919 – July 8, 2010) was an American statistician and mathematician who made significant contributions to game theory, probability theory, information theory, and statistics. He is one of the eponyms of the Rao–Blackwell theorem, and is also known for the Blackwell channel, Blackwell's contraction mapping theorem, Blackwell's approachability theorem, and the Blackwell order. He wrote one of the first Bayesian statistics textbooks, his 1969 Basic Statistics. He was the first African American inducted into the National Academy of Sciences, the first African American full professor with tenure at the University of California, Berkeley, and the seventh African American to receive a Ph.D. in mathematics. By the time he retired, he had published more than 90 papers and books on dynamic programming, game theory, and mathematical statistics. In 2012, President Barack Obama posthumously awarded Blackwell the National Medal of Science.

== Early life and education ==
David Harold Blackwell was born on April 24, 1919, in Centralia, Illinois, to Mabel Johnson Blackwell, a full-time homemaker, and Grover Blackwell, an Illinois Central Railroad worker. He was the eldest of four children with two brothers, J. W. and Joseph, and one sister, Elizabeth. Growing up in an integrated community, Blackwell attended "mixed" schools, where he distinguished himself in mathematics. During elementary school, his teachers promoted him beyond his grade level on two occasions. It was in a high school geometry course, however, that his passion for mathematics began. An exceptional student, Blackwell graduated from high school in 1935 at the age of sixteen.

Blackwell entered the University of Illinois at Urbana-Champaign with the intent to study elementary school mathematics and become a teacher. He was a member of Alpha Phi Alpha, a black fraternity that housed him for his full six years as a student. He earned his bachelor's degree in mathematics in three years in 1938 and, a year later, a master's degree in 1939. He was awarded a Doctor of Philosophy in mathematics in 1941 at the age of 22. His doctoral advisor was Joseph L. Doob. At the time, Blackwell was the seventh African American to earn a Ph.D. in mathematics in the United States and the first at the University of Illinois at Urbana-Champaign. His doctoral thesis was on Markov chains.

== Career and research ==
=== Postdoctoral study and early career ===
Blackwell completed one year of postdoctoral research as a fellow at the Institute for Advanced Study (IAS) at Princeton in 1941 after receiving a Rosenwald Fellowship, which was a fund to aid black scholars. There he met John von Neumann, who asked Blackwell to discuss his Ph.D. thesis with him. Blackwell, who believed that von Neumann was just being polite and not genuinely interested in his work, did not approach him until von Neumann himself asked him again a few months later. According to Blackwell, "He (von Neumann) listened to me talk about this rather obscure subject and in ten minutes he knew more about it than I did."

While a postdoc at IAS, Blackwell was prevented from attending lectures or undertaking research at nearby Princeton University, which the IAS has historically collaborated with in research and scholarship activities, because of his race.

Seeking a permanent position elsewhere, he wrote letters of application to 104 historically black colleges and universities in 1942, and received a total of only three offers. He felt at the time that a black professor would be limited to teaching at black colleges. Having been highly recommended by his dissertation advisor Joseph L. Doob for a position at the University of California, Berkeley, he was interviewed by statistician Jerzy Neyman. Neyman supported his appointment, and Griffith C. Evans, the head of the mathematics department, at first agreed and even convinced university president Robert Sproul that it was the correct decision, only to subsequently balk, citing the concerns of his wife. It was customary for Evans and his wife to invite the members of the department over for dinner and "she was not going to have any darkie in her house."

He was offered a post at Southern University at Baton Rouge, which he held in from 1942 to 1943, followed by a year as an Instructor at Clark College in Atlanta.

=== Howard University ===
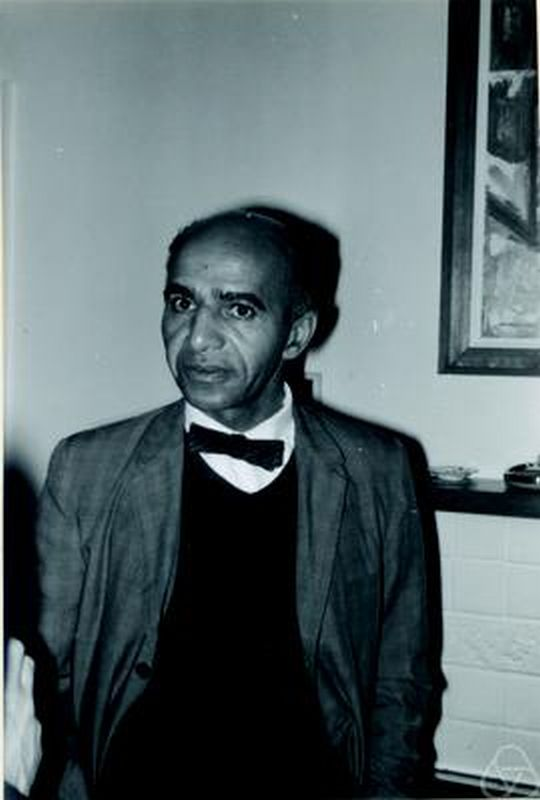
Blackwell in 1967

Blackwell joined the Mathematics Department at Howard University in 1944. When he joined, he was one of four faculty members and within three years he was appointed full professor and head of the department. He remained at Howard until 1954. In 1947, while at Howard, Blackwell published the paper "Conditional Expectation and Unbiased Sequential Estimation", which outlined a technique that later became known as the Rao–Blackwell theorem. The theorem provides a method for improving statistical estimates by potentially reducing their mean squared error.

From 1948 to 1950, Blackwell spent his summers at RAND Corporation with Meyer Abraham Girshick and other mathematicians exploring the game theory of duels. During the time Blackwell worked for RAND Corporation, the U.S. government consulted with him about developing models for the nuclear deterrence as a Cold War strategy. In the 1950-1951 academic year, Blackwell took leave from Howard to serve as a visiting professor of statistics at Stanford University, where he continued his collaboration with Girshick and interacted with economists and statisticians interested in game theory and decision‑making. Colleagues later recalled him returning to Stanford and other West Coast institutions for shorter visits and seminars throughout the 1950s, even after he accepted a full professorship at the University of California, Berkeley.

In 1954, Girshick and Blackwell published Theory of Games and Statistical Decisions. Aside from von Neumann and Girshick, other Blackwell collaborators and mentors included Leonard J. Savage, Richard E. Bellman, and Nobel Laureate Kenneth J. Arrow.

=== University of California, Berkeley ===
Blackwell took a position at the University of California, Berkeley as a visiting professor in 1954, and was hired as a full professor in the newly created Department of Statistics in 1955. He became the Statistics department chair in 1957.

Blackwell bridged topology and game theory via a game-theoretic proof of Kuratowski's coreduction principle for analytic subsets of a metric space in 1967. Blackwell only briefly extended his research beyond zero-sum games to explore the sure-thing principle as introduced by Jimmie Savage, primarily due to the real-world societal implications of the mathematical result, particularly for nuclear disarmament at the inception of the Cold War.

Blackwell wrote one of the first Bayesian textbooks, his 1969 Basic Statistics. It inspired the 1995 textbook Statistics: A Bayesian Perspective by the biostatistician Donald Berry.

He was appointed as a professor of mathematics at Berkeley in 1973. For the years 1973-75, Blackwell was away from Berkeley as director of the University of California Study Center for the United Kingdom and Ireland. In 1974, he was the W. W. Rouse Ball Lecturer at the University of Cambridge.

He spent the rest of his career at UC Berkeley, retiring in 1988 at age 70, which at that time was the mandatory retirement age. Over the course of his career, he mentored more than 60 students.

== Personal life and death ==
Blackwell married Annlizabeth Madison, a 1934 graduate of Spelman College, on December 27, 1944. They had eight children together, three sons and five daughters: Ann, Julia, David, Ruth, Grover, Vera, Hugo, and Sara.

David Blackwell died of complications from a stroke on July 8, 2010, at Alta Bates Summit Medical Center in Berkeley, California. He was 91 years old.

== Awards and honors ==
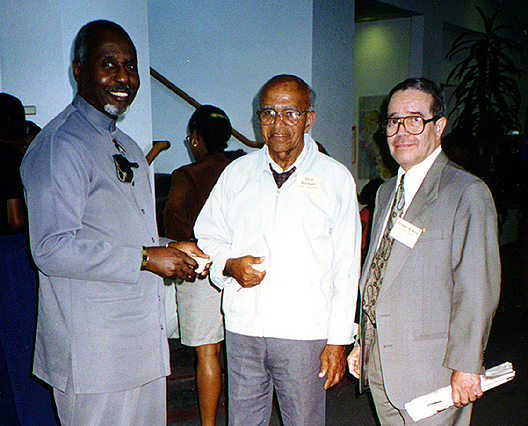
From left to right: Abdulalim Shabazz, David Blackwell, and J. Ernest Wilkins Jr. at the Conference for African American Researchers in the Mathematical Sciences in June 1995.

- Invited Speaker at the International Congress of Mathematicians, 1954
- President of the Institute of Mathematical Statistics, 1956
- Elected a member of the National Academy of Sciences (NAS), 1965
- Elected a member of the American Academy of Arts and Sciences (AAAS), 1968
- President of the Bernoulli Society for Mathematical Statistics and Probability, 1975-1977
- Honorary Fellow of the Royal Statistical Society (RSS), 1976
- Vice President of the American Statistical Association (ASA), 1978
- Awarded the John von Neumann Theory Prize in 1979
- Awarded the R. A. Fisher Lectureship, 1986
- Elected a member of the American Philosophical Society, 1990
- Fellow of the Institute for Operations Research and the Management Sciences, 2002
- Awarded the National Medal of Science (posthumous), 2012

=== Honorary doctorates ===
In his lifetime, Blackwell received 13 honorary doctorates: eleven from American universities (the University of Illinois, Michigan State University, Southern Illinois University, Carnegie-Mellon University, Amherst College, Harvard University, Howard University, Yale University, Syracuse University, the University of Southern California, and North Carolina State University) and two from international universities (the National University of Lesotho and the University of Warwick).

== Legacy ==
The Mathematical Association of America's MathFest, in coordination with the National Association of Mathematicians, features an annual MAA-NAM David Blackwell Lecture. Blackwell offered the inaugural address in 1994; and subsequent lecturers are researchers who "exemplif[y] the spirit of Blackwell in both personal achievement and service to the mathematical community."

The Blackwell-Tapia prize is named in honor of David Blackwell and Richard A. Tapia.

The University of California, Berkeley named an undergraduate residence hall in his honor, named David Blackwell Hall. The residence hall opened in Fall 2018.

An educational book about his life titled David Blackwell and the Deadliest Duel was published in 2019.

Blackwell made the following statement about his values and work in a 1983 interview for a project called "Mathematical People":

Basically, I'm not interested in doing research and I never have been....I'm interested in understanding, which is quite a different thing. And often to understand something you have to work it out yourself because no one else has done it.

In March 2024, Nvidia announced its Blackwell GPU architecture, named in honor of David Blackwell. Their CEO Jenson Huang said, "This GPU is named after David Blackwell, an American mathematician and statistician whose work has had a lasting impact in mathematics as well as the specific domain of AI."

Leeza Blackwell, the granddaughter of David Blackwell, is developing a documentary film about her grandfather’s life and contributions called Game of Genius.

== Bibliography ==
=== Books ===
- Blackwell, David; Girshick, M. A. (1954). Theory of Games and Statistical Decisions. New York: John Wiley & Sons.
- Blackwell, D. (1969). Basic Statistics. McGraw Hill.

=== Journal articles ===
- Blackwell, David (1947). "Conditional Expectation and Unbiased Sequential Estimation". The Annals of Mathematical Statistics. 18 (1): 105–110. doi:10.1214/aoms/1177730497. MR 0019903. Zbl 0033.07603.
- Arrow, K. J.; Blackwell, David; Girshick, M. A. (1949). "Bayes and Minimax Solutions of Sequential Decision Problems". Econometrica. 17 (3/4): 213–244. doi:10.2307/1905525. JSTOR 1905525.
- Blackwell, David (1953). "Equivalent Comparisons of Experiments". The Annals of Mathematical Statistics. 24 (2): 265–272. Bibcode:1953AnnMS..24..265B. doi:10.1214/aoms/1177729032.
- Blackwell, David; Koopmans, Lambert (1957). "On the Identifiability Problem for Functions of Finite Markov Chains". The Annals of Mathematical Statistics. 28 (4): 1011–1015. doi:10.1214/aoms/1177706802.
- Blackwell, David (1962). "Discrete Dynamic Programming". The Annals of Mathematical Statistics. 33 (2): 719–726. doi:10.1214/aoms/1177704593.
- Blackwell, David (1965). "Discounted Dynamic Programming". The Annals of Mathematical Statistics. 36 (1): 226–235. doi:10.1214/aoms/1177700285.
- Blackwell, David; Ferguson, T. S. (1968). "The Big Match". The Annals of Mathematical Statistics. 39 (1): 159–163. doi:10.1214/aoms/1177698513.
- Blackwell, David (1973). "Discreteness of Ferguson Selections". The Annals of Statistics. 1 (2): 356–358. Bibcode:1973AnSta...142373B. doi:10.1214/aos/1176342373.
