= Richard S. Bucy =

American applied mathematician (1935–2019)

- Born: Richard Snowden Bucy; July 20, 1935; Washington, D.C., U.S.
- Died: November 2, 2019 (aged 84); Redondo Beach, California, U.S.
- Known for: Kalman–Bucy filter

Academic background
- Education: MIT; University of California, Berkeley
- Thesis: Recurrent Events for Markov Chains (1963)
- Doctoral advisor: David Blackwell

Academic work
- Institutions: RIAS; University of Maryland, College Park; University of Colorado Boulder; University of Southern California

Richard Snowden Bucy (July 20, 1935 – November 2, 2019), also known as Dick Bucy, was an American aerospace engineer and applied mathematician. He is an IEEE fellow and is best known for his contributions to the Kalman-Bucy filter, developed together with Rudolf E. Kálmán.

== Education and career ==
Bucy was born in Washington, D.C. to Marie Glinke and Richard Evans. He took the surname of his stepfather, Edmond H. Bucy. Bucy attended St. Albans School in Washington, D.C., and the Boston Latin School in Boston. He entered Massachusetts Institute of Technology to study mathematics and received a bachelor's degree in 1957 in mathematics there. In 1963, he earned his doctorate in statistics at the University of California, Berkeley, under the supervision of David Blackwell.

Bucy was an assistant professor in mathematics at the University of Maryland, College Park from 1964 to 1965, and an associate professor in aerospace engineering at the University of Colorado Boulder from 1965 to 1966. In 1966, Bucy moved to the University of Southern California, where he stayed for the remainder of this academic years in the Department of Aerospace Engineering. Bucy was a visiting professor at Paul Sabatier University in Toulouse and the Technical University of Berlin.

Bucy became an IEEE fellow in 1975 "for developments in linear and nonlinear filtering theory".

Bucy was married to Ofelia Teresa and they had two sons, Phillip and Erwin. He died on November 2, 2019, in Redondo Beach.

== Research ==
Together with his mentor Rudolf Kálmán, Bucy published the foundational work on the Kalman-Bucy filter in 1961, while they were working at the Research Institute for Advanced Studies in Baltimore run by a division of Lockheed Martin. Besides filtering theory, Bucy worked in mathematical fields such as functional analysis and ordinary differential equations.

== Books ==
- Bucy, Richard S.; Hecht, Calvin; Senne, Kenneth D. (1972). An Engineer's Guide to Building Nonlinear Filters. Vol. 1–2. U.S. Air Force Academy, Colorado: Frank J. Seiler Research Laboratory.
- Bucy, Richard S.; Moura, José M. F., eds. (1983). Nonlinear stochastic problems. NATO ASI series. Series C, Mathematical and physical sciences. Dordrecht ; Boston: D. Reidel Pub. ISBN 978-90-277-1590-6.
- Bucy, Richard S. (1994). Lectures on Discrete Time Filtering. Signal Processing and Digital Filtering. New York, NY: Springer. doi:10.1007/978-1-4613-8392-5. ISBN 978-1-4613-8392-5.
- Bucy, Richard S.; Joseph, Peter D. (2005). Filtering for stochastic processes with applications to guidance (2 ed.). Providence, Rhode Island: AMS Chelsea Pub. ISBN 978-0-8218-3782-5.
