= Rolando Chuaqui =

Chilean mathematician (1935–1994)

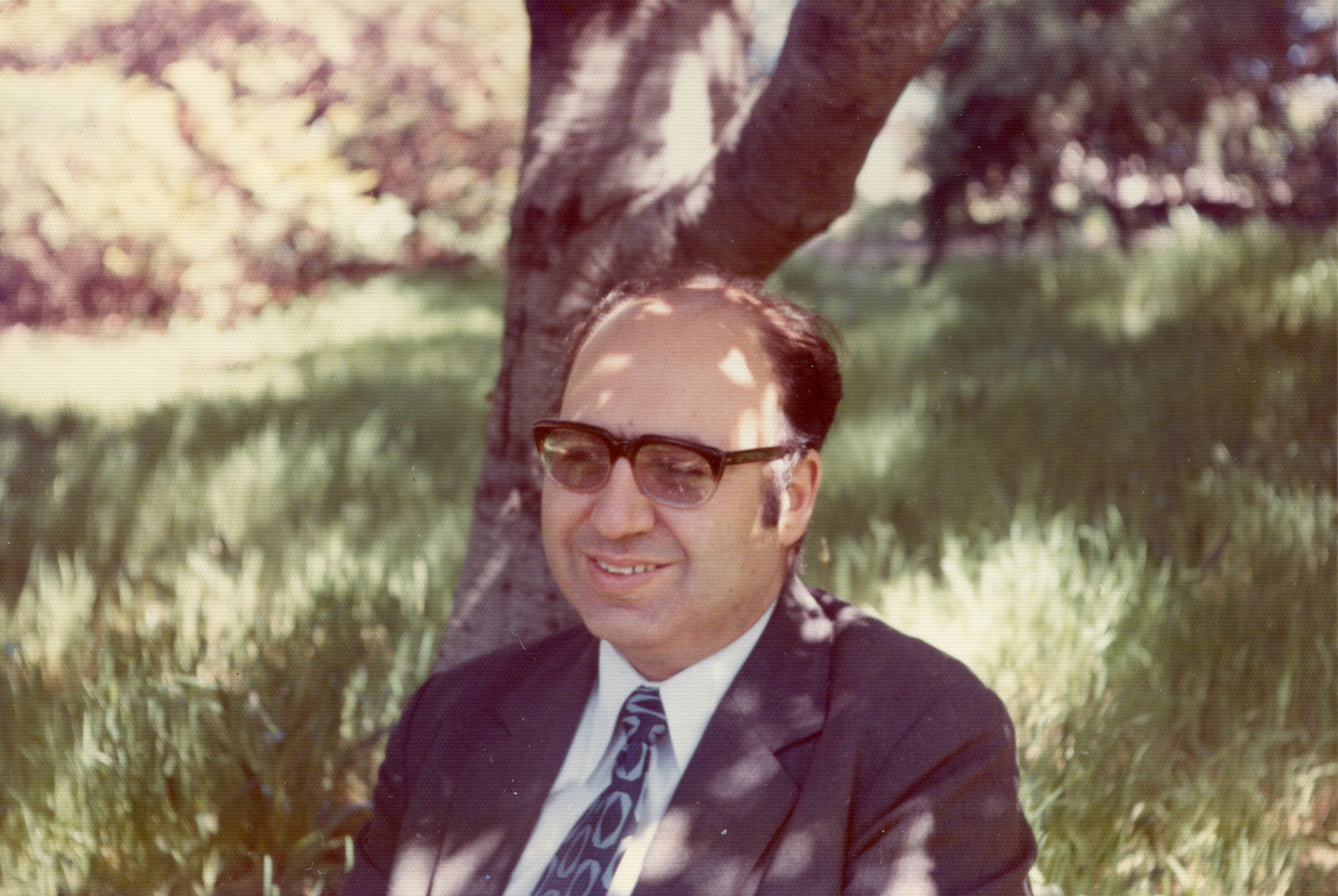
- Chuaqui in 1973
- Born: December 30, 1935; Santiago, Chile
- Died: April 23, 1994 (aged 58); Santiago, Chile
- Education: University of California, Berkeley
- Scientific career
- Thesis: A Definition of Probability Based on Equal Likelihood (1965)
- Doctoral advisor: David Blackwell

Rolando Basim Chuaqui Kettlun (December 30, 1935–April 23, 1994) was a Chilean mathematician who worked on the foundations of probabilities and foundations of mathematics. Throughout his lifetime, he published two books and over 50 journal articles in mathematics and logic. He also spearheaded the creation and expansion of mathematics departments across multiple Chilean universities.

== Biography ==
Chuaqui was born into a Syrian immigrant family from Homs in Syria. He entered the University of Chile in 1953 to study medicine. He obtained a Ph.D. in Logic and the Methodology of Science, an interdisciplinary program between the Department of Mathematics and Department of Philosophy, from the University of California, Berkeley in 1965. His doctoral advisor was David Blackwell. Chuaqui returned to Chile after graduating, serving as a professor at the University of Chile and then the Pontifical Catholic University of Chile. During his time at the Pontifical Catholic, he advised three doctoral students.

Chuaqui held several visiting positions, including at UCLA (1967), Princeton University (1970), University of São Paulo (1971 and 1982), University of California, Berkeley (1973–74), University of Campinas (1976, 1977 and 1978), Stanford University (1984), and San José State University (1986-89).

He was a long-term collaborator of Patrick Suppes, with whom he worked on non-standard analysis and measurement in sciences. In 1986, he proposed a mathematical formulation for pragmatic truth.

== Honors and awards ==
He was awarded a Guggenheim Fellowship in Mathematics in 1983.

Since 1999, a series of annual research conferences in Chile, known as the Jornadas Rolando Chuaqui Kettlun, is held in his memory. The Pontifical Catholic University of Chile also has a building named after him, which houses its Department of Mathematics.
