= Blackwell channel =

Broadcast channel in information theory

The Blackwell channel is a deterministic broadcast channel model used in coding theory and information theory. It was first proposed by mathematician David Blackwell. In this model, a transmitter transmits one of three symbols to two receivers. For two of the symbols, both receivers receive exactly what was sent; the third symbol, however, is received differently at each of the receivers. This is one of the simplest examples of a non-trivial capacity result for a non-stochastic channel.

== Definition ==
The Blackwell channel is composed of one input (transmitter) and two outputs (receivers). The channel input is ternary (three symbols) and is selected from {0, 1, 2}. This symbol is broadcast to the receivers; that is, the transmitter sends one symbol simultaneously to both receivers. Each of the channel outputs is binary (two symbols), labeled {0, 1}.

Whenever a 0 is sent, both outputs receive a 0. Whenever a 1 is sent, both outputs receive a 1. When a 2 is sent, however, the first output is 0 and the second output is 1. Therefore, the symbol 2 is confused by each of the receivers in a different way.

The operation of the channel is memoryless and completely deterministic.

=== Capacity of the Blackwell channel ===
The capacity of the channel was found by S. I. Gel'fand. It is defined by the region:

1. R_{1} = 1, 0 ≤ R_{2} ≤ 1/2
2. R_{1} = H(a), R_{2} = 1 − a, for 1/3 ≤ a ≤ 1/2
3. R_{1} + R_{2} = log_{2} 3, log_{2} 3 - 2/3 ≤ R_{1} ≤ 2/3
4. R_{1} = 1 − a, R_{2} = H(a), for 1/3 ≤ a ≤ 1/2
5. 0 ≤ R_{1} ≤ 1/2, R_{2} = 1

A solution was also found by Pinkser et al. (1995).
