= Comparametric equation =

Mathematical concept

A comparametric equation is an equation that describes a parametric relationship between a function and a dilated version of the same function, where the equation does not involve the parameter. For example, ƒ(2t) = 4ƒ(t) is a comparametric equation, when we define g(t) = ƒ(2t), so that we have g = 4ƒ no longer contains the parameter, t. The comparametric equation g = 4ƒ has a family of solutions, one of which is ƒ = t^{2}.

To see that ƒ = t^{2} is a solution, we merely substitute back in: g = ƒ(2t) = (2t)^{2} = 4t^{2} = 4ƒ, so that g = 4ƒ.

Comparametric equations arise naturally in signal processing when we have multiple measurements of the same phenomenon, in which each of the measurements was acquired using a different sensitivity. For example, two or more differently exposed pictures of the same subject matter give rise to a comparametric relationship, the solution of which is the response function of the camera, image sensor, or imaging system. In this sense, comparametric equations are the fundamental mathematical basis for HDR (high dynamic range) imaging, as well as HDR audio.

Comparametric equations have been used in many areas of research, and have many practical applications to the real world. They are used in radar, microphone arrays, and have been used in processing crime scene video in homicide trials in which the only evidence against the accused was video recordings of the murder.

== Solution ==
An existing solution is comparametric camera response function (CCRF) for real-time comparametric analysis. It has applications in the analysis of multiple images.

== Related concepts ==
- Parametric equation
- Functional equation
- Contraction mapping
